= Eleanor Roosevelt =

American diplomat and activist (1884–1962)

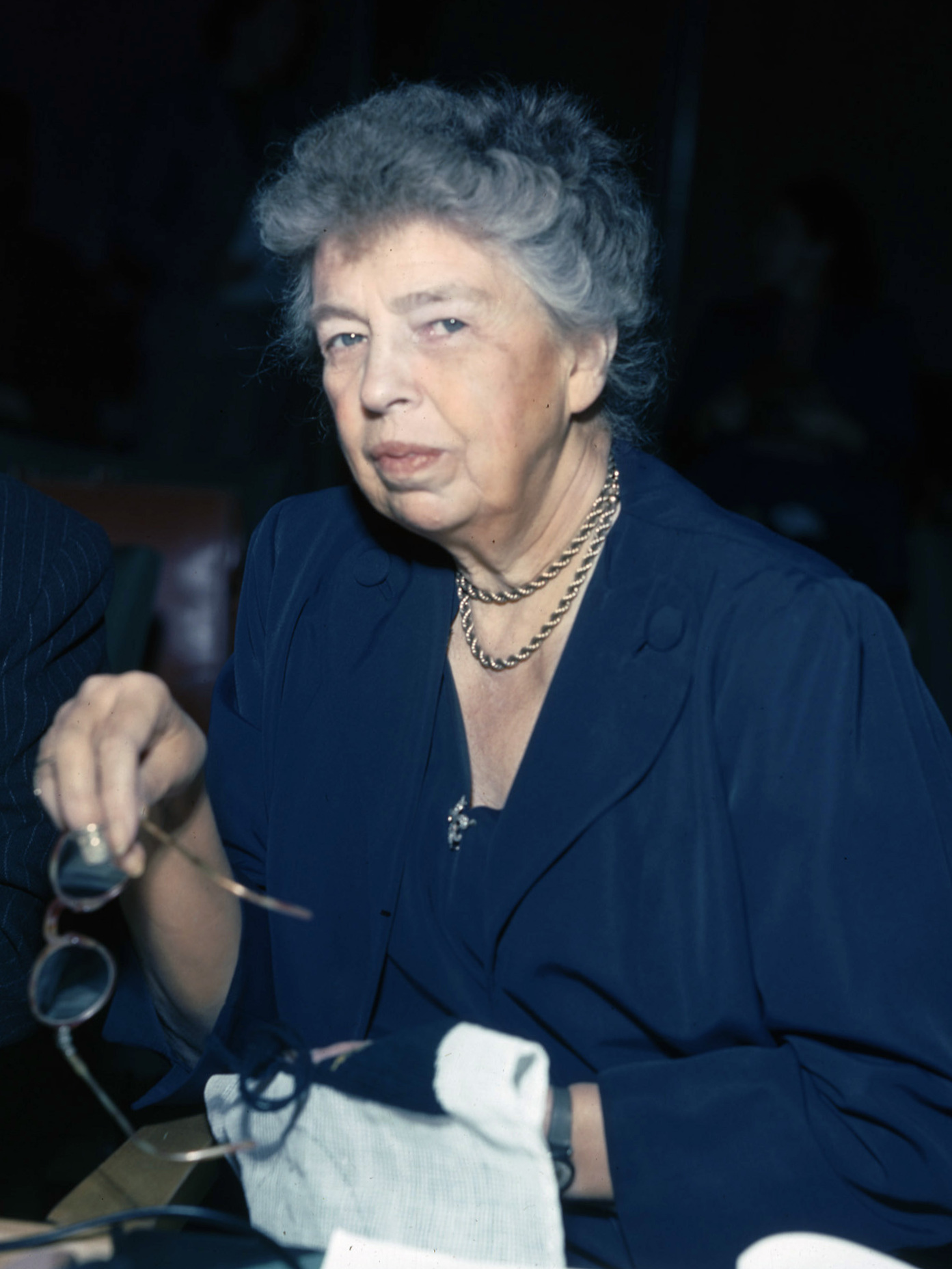
- Roosevelt c. 1946–1947

1st Chair of the Presidential Commission on the Status of Women
- In office January 20, 1961 – November 7, 1962
- President: John F. Kennedy
- Preceded by: Office established
- Succeeded by: Esther Peterson

1st United States Representative to the United Nations Commission on Human Rights
- In office January 27, 1947 – January 20, 1953
- President: Harry S. Truman
- Preceded by: Office established
- Succeeded by: Mary Pillsbury Lord

1st Chair of the United Nations Commission on Human Rights
- In office April 29, 1946 – December 30, 1952
- Preceded by: Office established
- Succeeded by: Charles Malik

First Lady of the United States
- In role March 4, 1933 – April 12, 1945
- President: Franklin D. Roosevelt
- Preceded by: Lou Henry Hoover
- Succeeded by: Bess Truman

First Lady of New York
- In role January 1, 1929 – December 31, 1932
- Governor: Franklin D. Roosevelt
- Preceded by: Catherine Smith
- Succeeded by: Edith Lehman

Personal details
- Born: Anna Eleanor Roosevelt; October 11, 1884 New York City, U.S.
- Died: November 7, 1962 (aged 78) New York City, U.S.
- Resting place: Springwood Estate, Hyde Park, New York, U.S.
- Party: Democratic
- Spouse: Franklin D. Roosevelt (m. 1905; died 1945)
- Children: 6, including Anna, James, Elliott, Franklin Jr., and John
- Parents: Elliott Roosevelt; Anna Rebecca Hall
- Relatives: Roosevelt family Livingston family Delano family (by marriage)

Anna Eleanor Roosevelt (/ˈɛlɪnɔːr ˈroʊzəvɛlt/ EL-in-or ROH-zə-velt; October 11, 1884 – November 7, 1962) was an American political figure, diplomat, and activist. She was the longest-serving first lady of the United States, during her husband Franklin D. Roosevelt's four terms as president from 1933 to 1945. Through her travels, public engagement, and advocacy, she largely redefined the role. Widowed in 1945, she served as a United States delegate to the United Nations General Assembly from 1945 to 1952, and took a leading role in designing the text and gaining international support for the Universal Declaration of Human Rights. In 1948, she was given a standing ovation by the assembly upon their adoption of the declaration. President Harry S. Truman called her the "First Lady of the World" in tribute to her human rights achievements.

Roosevelt was a member of the prominent and wealthy Roosevelt and Livingston families and a niece of President Theodore Roosevelt. She had an unhappy childhood, having suffered the deaths of both parents and one of her brothers at a young age. At 15, she attended Allenswood Boarding Academy in London and was deeply influenced by its founder and director Marie Souvestre. Returning to the U.S., she married her fifth cousin once removed, Franklin Delano Roosevelt, in 1905. Between 1906 and 1916 she gave birth to six children, one of whom died in infancy. The Roosevelts' marriage became complicated after Eleanor discovered her husband's affair with her social secretary, Lucy Mercer, in 1918. Due to mediation by her mother-in-law, Sara, the liaison was ended officially. After that, both partners started to keep independent agendas, and Eleanor joined the Women's Trade Union League and became active in the New York state Democratic Party. Roosevelt helped persuade her husband to stay in politics after he was stricken with a paralytic illness in 1921. Following Franklin's election as governor of New York in 1928, and throughout the remainder of Franklin's political career, Roosevelt regularly made public appearances on his behalf; and as first lady, while her husband served as president, she greatly influenced the present scope and future of the role.

Roosevelt was, in her time, one of the world's most widely admired and powerful women. Nevertheless, in her early years in the White House she was controversial for her outspokenness, particularly with respect to her promotion of civil rights for African Americans. She was the first presidential spouse to hold regular press conferences, write a daily newspaper column, write a monthly magazine column, host a weekly radio show, and speak at a national party convention. On a few occasions, she publicly disagreed with her husband's policies. She launched an experimental community at Arthurdale, West Virginia, for the families of unemployed miners, later widely regarded as a failure. She advocated for expanded roles for women in the workplace, the civil rights of African Americans and Asian Americans, and the rights of World War II refugees.

Following her husband's death in 1945, Roosevelt pressed the United States to join and support the United Nations and became its first delegate to the committee on Human Rights. She served as the first chair of the UN Commission on Human Rights and oversaw the drafting of the Universal Declaration of Human Rights. Later, she chaired the John F. Kennedy administration's Presidential Commission on the Status of Women until her death in 1962. By the time of her death, Roosevelt was regarded as "one of the most esteemed women in the world"; The New York Times called her "the object of almost universal respect" in her obituary. In 1999, Roosevelt was ranked ninth in the top ten of Gallup's List of Most Widely Admired People of the 20th Century, and was found to rank as the most admired woman in thirteen different years between 1948 and 1961 in Gallup's annual most admired woman poll. Periodic surveys conducted by the Siena College Research Institute have consistently seen historians assess Roosevelt as the greatest American first lady.

== Personal life ==
=== Early life ===
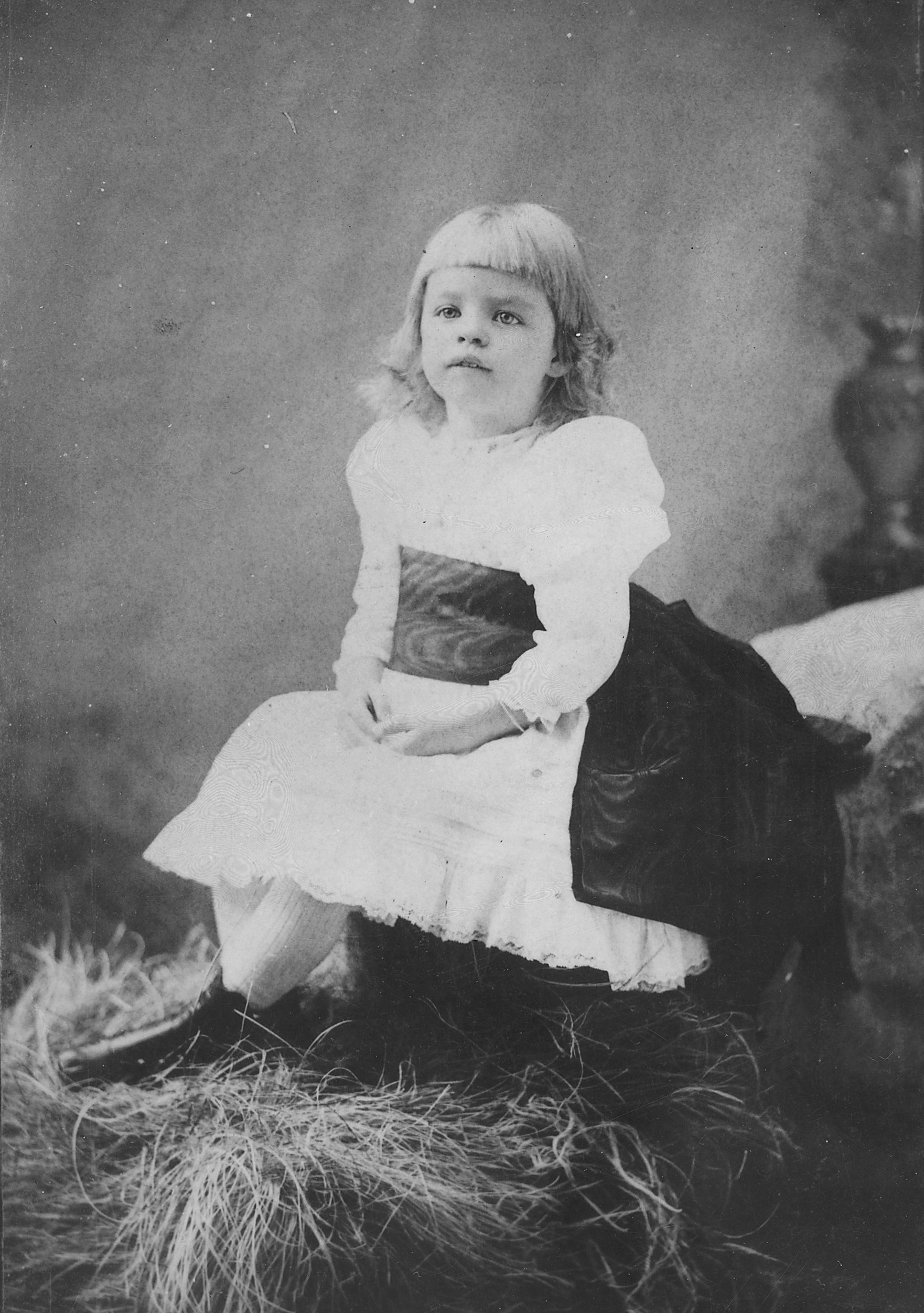
Roosevelt as a child, 1887

Anna Eleanor Roosevelt was born on October 11, 1884, in Manhattan, New York City, to socialites Anna Rebecca Hall and Elliott Roosevelt. From an early age she preferred to be called by her middle name, Eleanor. Through her father, she was a niece of President Theodore Roosevelt. Through her mother, she was a niece of tennis champions Valentine Gill "Vallie" Hall III and Edward Ludlow Hall. Her mother nicknamed her "Granny" because she acted in such a serious manner as a child. Her mother was emotionally distant and was also somewhat ashamed of her daughter's alleged "plainness".

Roosevelt had two younger brothers: Elliott Jr. and Hall. She also had a half-brother, Elliott Roosevelt Mann, through her father's affair with Katy Mann, a servant employed by the family. Roosevelt was born into a world of immense wealth and privilege, as her family was part of New York high society called the "swells".

On May 19, 1887, the two-year-old Roosevelt was on board the SS Britannic with her father, mother and aunt Tissie, when it collided with White Star Liner SS Celtic. She was lowered into a lifeboat and she and her parents were taken to the Celtic and returned to New York. After this traumatic event, Eleanor was afraid of ships and the sea all her life.

Her mother died from diphtheria on December 7, 1892, and Elliott Jr. died of the same disease the following May. Her father, an alcoholic confined to a sanitarium, died on August 14, 1894, after jumping from a window during a fit of delirium tremens. He survived the fall but died from a seizure. Roosevelt's childhood losses left her prone to depression throughout her life. Her brother Hall later suffered from alcoholism. Before her father died, he implored her to act as a mother towards Hall, and it was a request she made good upon for the rest of Hall's life. Roosevelt doted on Hall, and when he enrolled at Groton School in 1907, she accompanied him as a chaperone. While he was attending Groton, she wrote him almost daily, but always felt a touch of guilt that Hall had not had a fuller childhood. She took pleasure in Hall's brilliant performance at school, and was proud of his many academic accomplishments, which included a master's degree in engineering from Harvard.

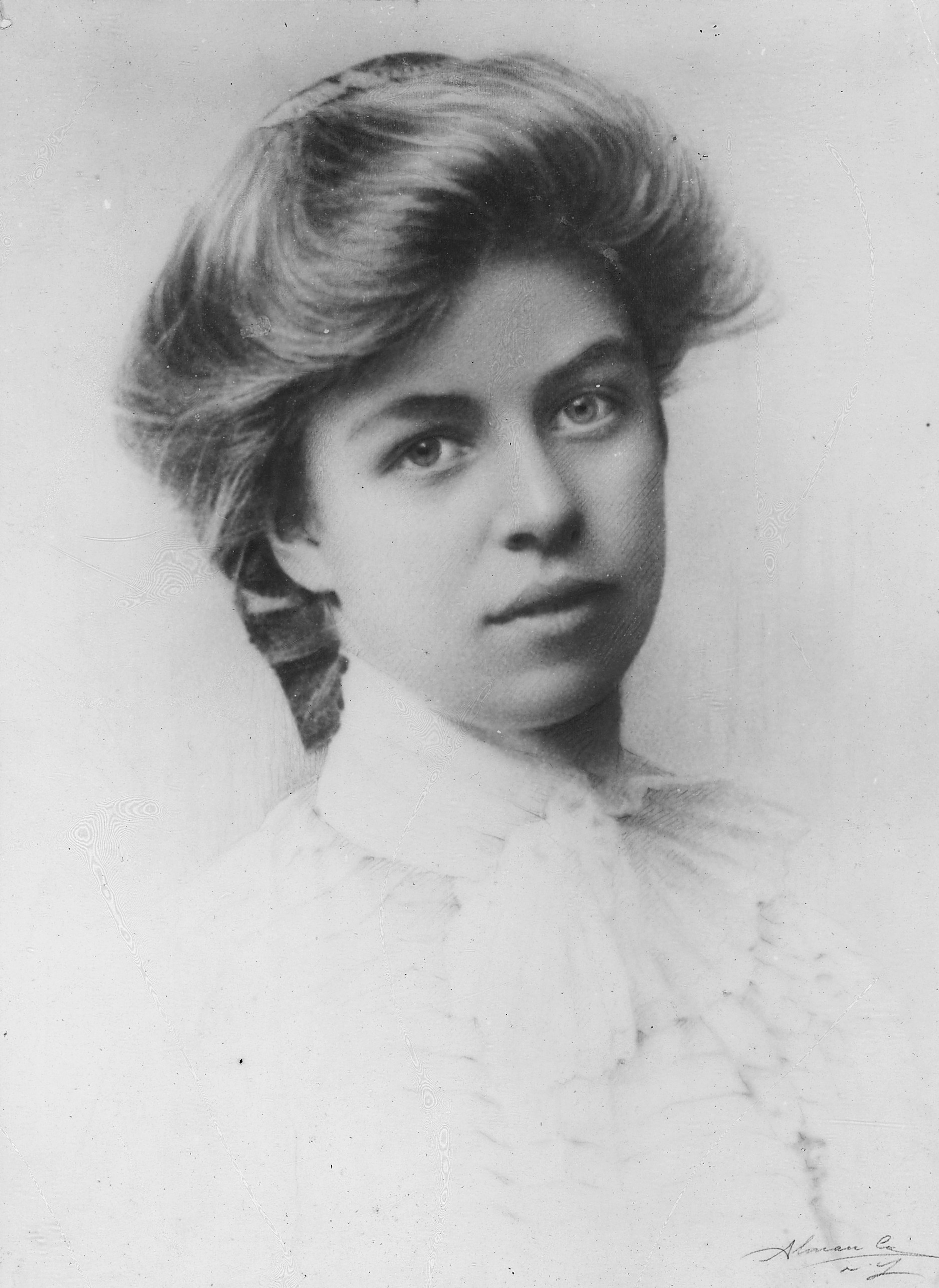
School photo of 14-year-old Roosevelt, 1898

After the deaths of her parents, Roosevelt was raised in the household of her maternal grandmother, Mary Livingston Ludlow Hall of the Livingston family in Tivoli, New York. Insecure and starved for affection, she considered herself the "ugly duckling." However, Roosevelt wrote at 14 that one's prospects in life were not totally dependent on physical beauty: "no matter how plain a woman may be if truth and loyalty are stamped upon her face all will be attracted to her."

Roosevelt was tutored privately and at the age of 15, with the encouragement of her aunt Anna "Bamie" Roosevelt, she was sent to Allenswood Academy, a private finishing school in Wimbledon, London, England, where she was educated from 1899 to 1902. The headmistress, Marie Souvestre, was a noted educator who sought to cultivate independent thinking in young women though a rigorous curriculum. Souvestre took a special interest in Roosevelt, who learned to speak French fluently and gained self-confidence. Roosevelt's first cousin Corinne Douglas Robinson, whose first term at Allenswood overlapped with Roosevelt's last, said that by the time she arrived at the school, Roosevelt was "'everything' at the school. She was beloved by everybody." Roosevelt wished to continue at Allenswood, but she was summoned home by her grandmother in 1902 to make her social debut. Roosevelt and Souvestre maintained a correspondence until Souvestre's death in March 1905, and after this Roosevelt kept Souvestre's portrait on her desk and brought her letters with her.

At age 17 in 1902, Roosevelt completed her formal education and returned to the United States; she was presented at a debutante ball at the Waldorf-Astoria hotel on December 14. She was later given her own "coming out party". She said of her debut in a public discussion once, "It was simply awful. It was a beautiful party, of course, but I was so unhappy, because a girl who comes out is so utterly miserable if she does not know all the young people. Of course I had been so long abroad that I had lost touch with all the girls I used to know in New York. I was miserable through all that."

Roosevelt was active with the New York Junior League shortly after its founding, teaching dancing and calisthenics in the East Side slums. The organization had been brought to Roosevelt's attention by her friend, organization founder Mary Harriman, and a male relative who criticized the group for "drawing young women into public activity".

A devout Episcopalian, Roosevelt regularly attended services, and studied the New Testament. Dr. Harold Ivan Smith states that she, "was very public about her faith. In hundreds of "My Day" and "If You Ask Me" columns, she addressed issues of faith, prayer and the Bible."

=== Marriage and family life ===
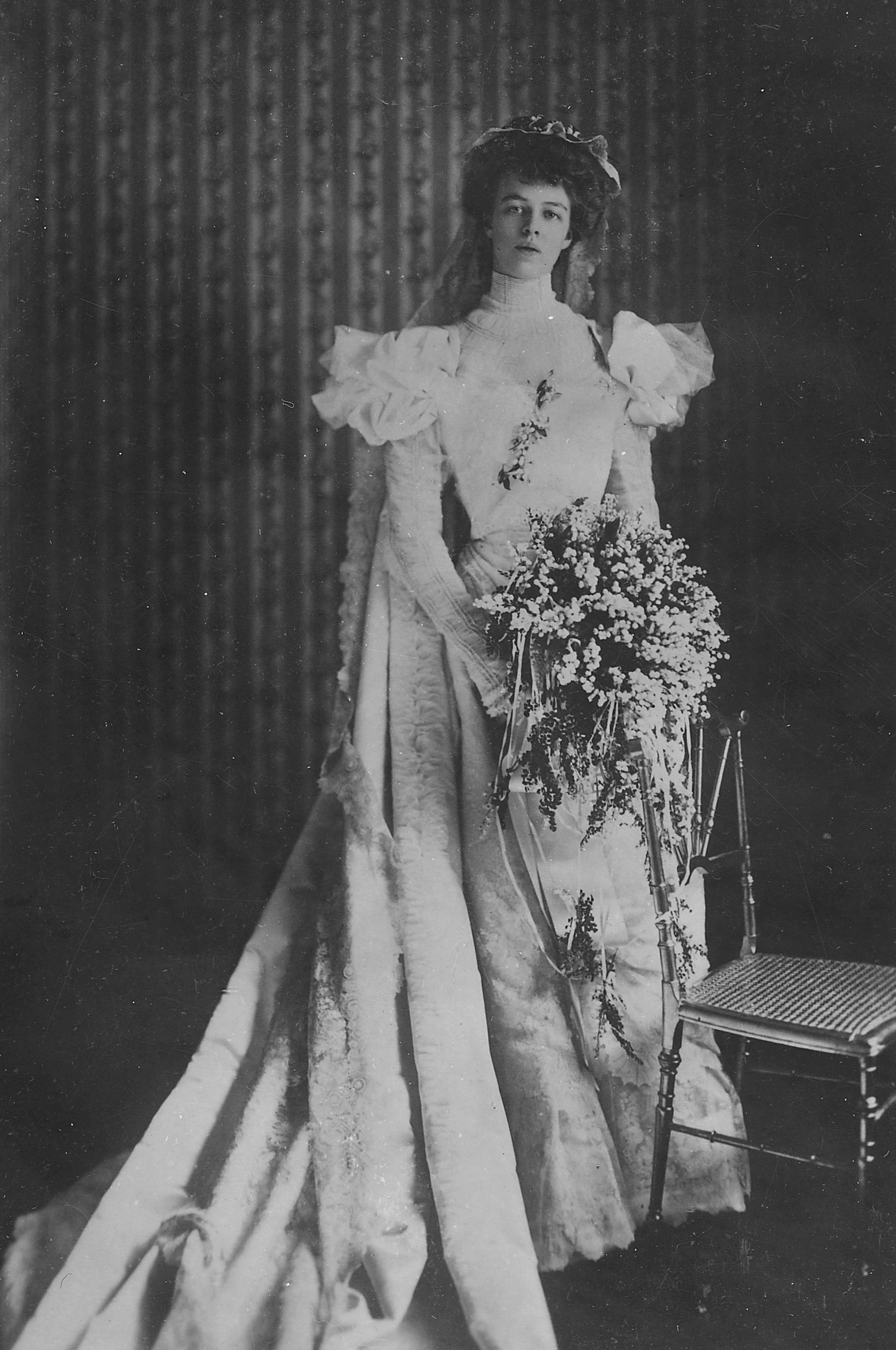
Roosevelt in her wedding dress, 1905

In the summer of 1902, Roosevelt encountered her father's fifth cousin & godson, Franklin Delano Roosevelt, on a train to Tivoli, New York. The two began a secret correspondence and romance, and became engaged on November 22, 1903. Franklin's mother, Sara Ann Delano, opposed the union and made him promise that the engagement would not be officially announced for a year. "I know what pain I must have caused you," he wrote to his mother of his decision. However, he added, "I know my own mind, and known it for a long time, and know that I could never think otherwise." Sara took her son on a Caribbean cruise in 1904, hoping that a separation would squelch the romance, but Franklin remained determined. The couple set their wedding date of March 17, 1905, to accommodate Eleanor's uncle, President Theodore Roosevelt, who was scheduled to be in New York City for the St. Patrick's Day parade, and who agreed to stand in for his brother and give the bride away.

The marriage took place in New York City at the home of the bride's cousins Mr. and Mrs. Henry Parish, Jr. The wedding was officiated by Endicott Peabody, the groom's headmaster at Groton School. Eleanor's cousin Corinne Robinson was a bridesmaid, as was Alice Roosevelt, daughter of Teddy Roosevelt. Theodore Roosevelt's attendance at the ceremony was front-page news in The New York Times and other newspapers. When asked for his thoughts on the Roosevelt–Roosevelt union, the president said, "It is a good thing to keep the name in the family." The couple spent a preliminary honeymoon of one week at Hyde Park, then set up housekeeping in an apartment in New York. That summer they went on their formal honeymoon, a three-month tour of Europe.

Returning to the U.S., the newlyweds settled in a New York City house that was provided by Franklin's mother, as well as in a second residence at the family's estate overlooking the Hudson River in Hyde Park, New York. From the beginning, Roosevelt had a contentious relationship with her controlling mother-in-law. The townhouse that Sara gave to them was connected to her own residence by sliding doors, and Sara ran both households in the decade after the marriage. Early on, Eleanor had a breakdown in which she explained to Franklin that "I did not like to live in a house which was not in any way mine, one that I had done nothing about and which did not represent the way I wanted to live," but little changed. Sara also sought to control the raising of her grandchildren, and Eleanor reflected later that "Franklin's children were more my mother-in-law's children than they were mine." Eleanor's eldest son James remembered Sara telling her grandchildren, "Your mother only bore you, I am more your mother than your mother is."

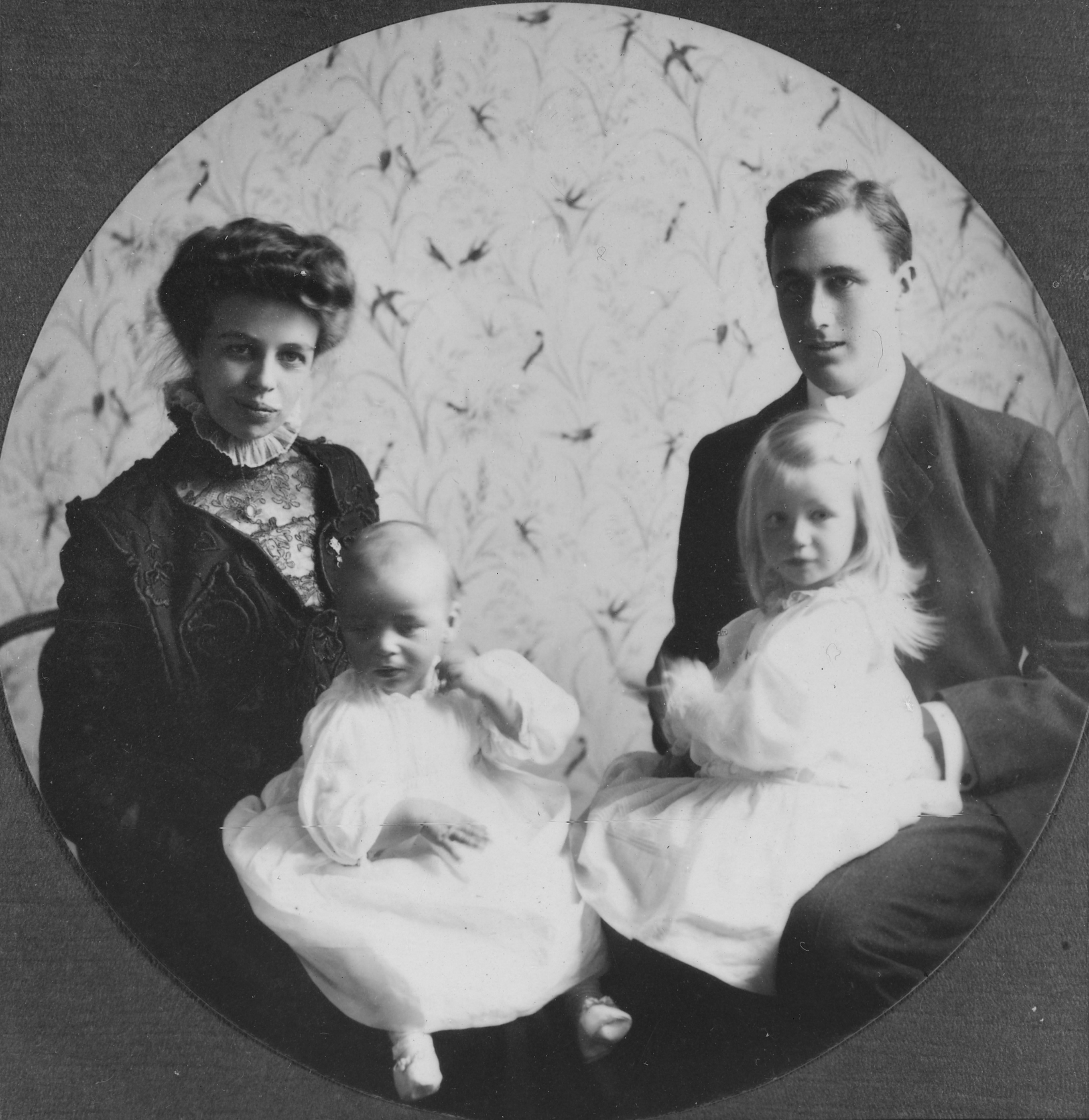
Eleanor and Franklin Roosevelt with their first two children, 1908

Eleanor and Franklin had six children:

- Anna Eleanor Roosevelt (1906–1975)
- James Roosevelt II (1907–1991)
- Franklin Roosevelt (1909–1909)
- Elliott Roosevelt (1910–1990)
- Franklin Delano Roosevelt Jr. (1914–1988)
- John Aspinwall Roosevelt (1916–1981)

Roosevelt disliked having sex with her husband. She once told her daughter Anna that it was an "ordeal to be borne." She also considered herself ill-suited to motherhood, later writing, "It did not come naturally to me to understand little children or to enjoy them."

In September 1918, Eleanor was unpacking one of Franklin's suitcases when she discovered a bundle of love letters to him from her social secretary, Lucy Mercer. He had been contemplating leaving his wife for Mercer. However, following pressure from his political advisor, Louis Howe, and from his mother, who threatened to disinherit Franklin if he followed through with a divorce, the couple remained married. Their union from that point on was more of a political partnership, and ceased to be an intimate one. Disillusioned, Roosevelt again became active in public life, and focused increasingly on her social work rather than her role as a wife.

In August 1921, the family was vacationing at their summer home on Campobello Island, New Brunswick, Canada, when Franklin was diagnosed with a paralytic illness, at the time believed to be polio. During the illness, through her nursing care, Eleanor probably saved Franklin from death. His legs remained permanently paralyzed. When the extent of his disability became clear, Eleanor fought a protracted battle with her mother-in-law over his future, persuading him to stay in politics despite Sara's urgings that he retire and become a country gentleman. Franklin's attending physician, Dr. William Keen, commended Eleanor's devotion to the stricken Franklin during the time of his travail. "You have been a rare wife and have borne your heavy burden most bravely," he said, proclaiming her "one of my heroines."

This proved a turning point in Eleanor and Sara's long-running struggle, and as Eleanor's public role grew, she increasingly broke from Sara's control. Tensions between Sara and Eleanor over her new political friends rose to the point that the family constructed a cottage at Val-Kill, in which Eleanor and her guests lived when Franklin and the children were away from Hyde Park. Roosevelt herself named the place Val-Kill, loosely translated as "waterfall-stream" from the Dutch language common to the original European settlers of the area. Franklin encouraged his wife to develop this property as a place where she could implement some of her ideas for work with winter jobs for rural workers and women. Each year, when Roosevelt held a picnic at Val-Kill for delinquent boys, her granddaughter Eleanor Roosevelt Seagraves assisted her. Seagraves was close to her grandmother throughout her life. Seagraves concentrated her career as an educator and librarian on keeping alive many of the causes Roosevelt began and supported.

In 1924, Eleanor campaigned for Democrat Alfred E. Smith in his successful re-election bid as governor of New York State against the Republican nominee, her first cousin Theodore Roosevelt Jr. Theodore Jr. never forgave her. Eleanor's aunt, Anna "Bamie" Roosevelt Cowles, publicly broke with her after the election. She wrote to her niece, "I just hate to have Eleanor let herself look as she does. Though never handsome, she always had to me a charming effect, but alas and lackaday! Since politics have become her choicest interest all her charm has disappeared...." Roosevelt dismissed Bamie's criticisms by referring to her as an "aged woman." However, Bamie and Roosevelt eventually reconciled.

Theodore's elder daughter Alice also broke with Roosevelt over her campaign. Alice and her cousin reconciled after the latter wrote Alice a comforting letter upon the death of Alice's daughter, Paulina Longworth.

Roosevelt and her daughter Anna became estranged after she took over some of her mother's social duties at the White House. The relationship was further strained because Roosevelt desperately wanted to go with her husband to Yalta in February 1945 (two months before Franklin's death), but he took Anna instead. A few years later, the two were able to reconcile and cooperate on numerous projects. Anna took care of her mother when she was terminally ill in 1962.

Roosevelt's son Elliott authored numerous books, including a mystery series in which his mother was the detective. However, these murder mysteries were researched and written by William Harrington. They continued until Harrington's death in 2000, ten years after Elliott's death. With James Brough, Elliott also wrote a highly personal book about his parents called The Roosevelts of Hyde Park: An Untold Story, in which he revealed details about the sexual lives of his parents, including his father's relationships with mistress Lucy Mercer and secretary Marguerite ("Missy") LeHand, as well as graphic details surrounding the illness that crippled his father. Published in 1973, the biography also contains valuable insights into Franklin's run for vice president, his rise to the governorship of New York, and his capture of the presidency in 1932, particularly with the help of Louis Howe. When Elliott published this book in 1973, his brother Franklin Jr. led the family's denunciation of him; the book was fiercely repudiated by all Elliott's siblings. His brother James published My Parents, a Differing View (with Bill Libby, 1976), which was written in part as a response to Elliott's book. Elliott published a sequel to An Untold Story in 1975. Written with James Brough and titled A Rendezvous With Destiny, the book carried the Roosevelt saga to the end of World War II. Mother R.: Eleanor Roosevelt's Untold Story, also written with Brough, was published in 1977. Eleanor Roosevelt, with Love: A Centenary Remembrance, came out in 1984.

=== Other relationships ===
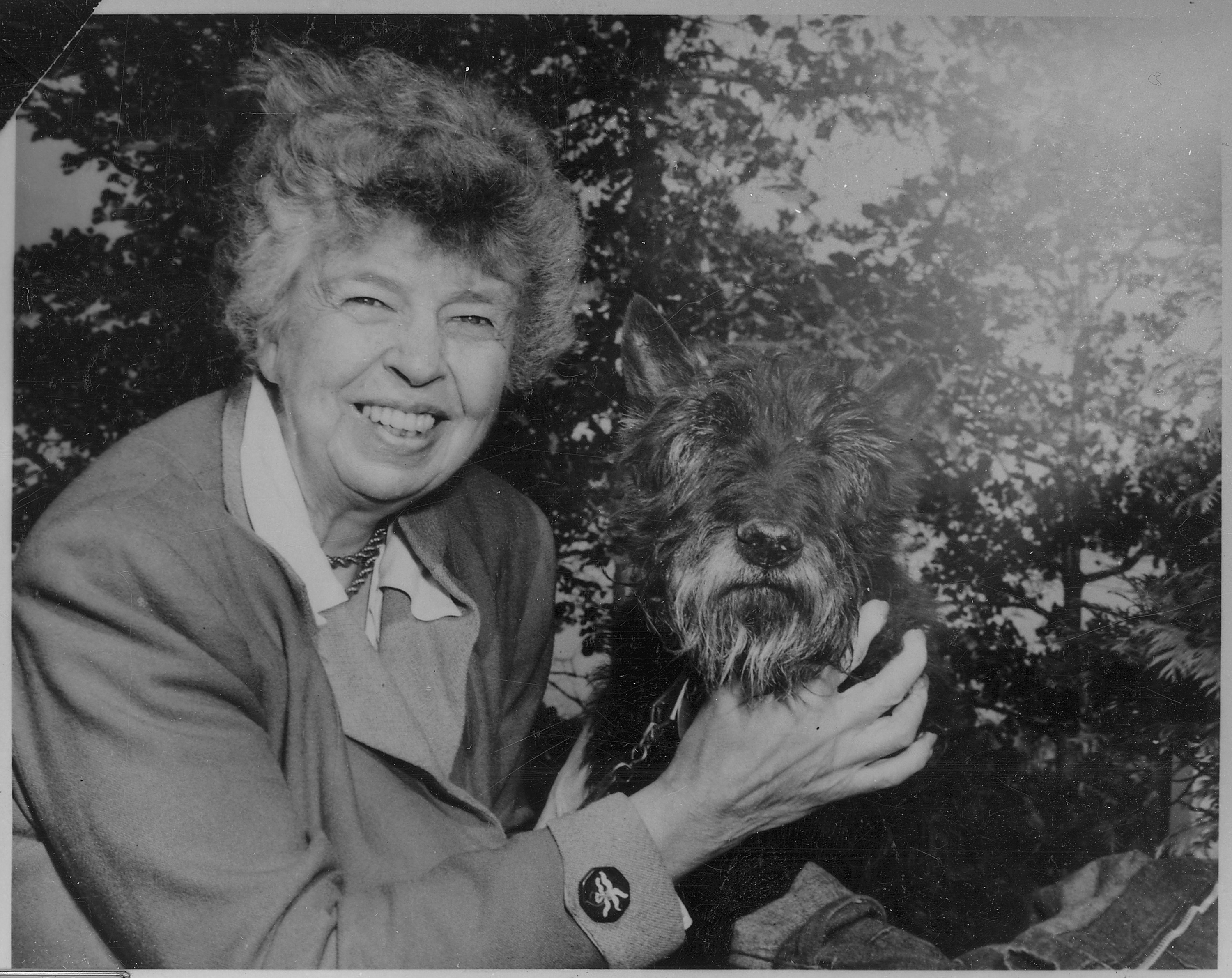
Roosevelt with her dog Fala in 1951

Eleanor had a close relationship with her aunt, Maude Livingston Hall. The younger sister of Eleanor's mother, Maude was only six years older than Eleanor and the two grew up together in the home of Maude's mother, Eleanor's grandmother. Their relationship was more like sisters than aunt and niece. After Maude divorced her first husband, the champion polo player Lawrence Waterbury, in 1912, she married the playwright and novelist David Gray in 1914 in a small ceremony attended only by Eleanor and the Roosevelt family lawyer, John M. Hackett. The couple maintained a close relationship with Eleanor and Franklin, and Eleanor was instrumental in successfully advocating for Gray's appointment as United States minister to Ireland, a post he held from 1940 to 1947.

In the 1930s, Roosevelt had a very close relationship with aviator Amelia Earhart (1897–1937). One time, the two snuck out from the White House and went to a party dressed up for the occasion. After flying with Earhart, Roosevelt obtained a student permit but did not further pursue her plans to learn to fly. Franklin was not in favor of his wife becoming a pilot. Nevertheless, the two women communicated frequently throughout their lives.

Roosevelt also had a close relationship with Associated Press (AP) reporter Lorena Hickok (1893–1968), who covered her during the last months of the presidential campaign and "fell madly in love with her." During this period, Roosevelt wrote daily 10- to 15-page letters to "Hick," who was planning to write a biography of the First Lady. The letters included such endearments as, "I want to put my arms around you & kiss you at the corner of your mouth," and, "I can't kiss you, so I kiss your 'picture' good night and good morning!" At Franklin's 1933 inauguration, Roosevelt wore a sapphire ring Hickok had given her. FBI Director J. Edgar Hoover despised Roosevelt's liberalism, her stance regarding civil rights, and criticisms of Hoover's surveillance tactics by both her and her husband, and so Hoover maintained a large file on Roosevelt, which the filmmakers of the biopic J. Edgar (2011) indicate included compromising evidence of this relationship, with which Hoover intended to blackmail Roosevelt. Compromised as a reporter, Hickok soon resigned her position with the AP to be closer to Roosevelt, who secured her a job as an investigator for a New Deal program.

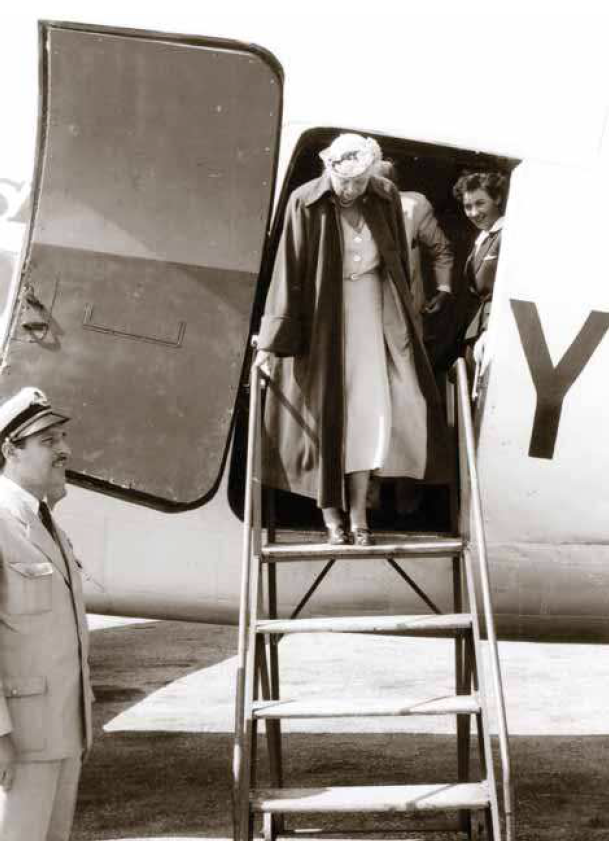
Roosevelt leaving an aircraft in Lučko Airport, Zagreb, Federal People's Republic of Yugoslavia, 1952

There is considerable debate about whether or not Roosevelt had a sexual relationship with Hickok. It was known in the White House press corps at the time that Hickok was a lesbian. Scholars, including Lillian Faderman and Hazel Rowley, have asserted that there was a physical component to the relationship, while Hickok biographer Doris Faber has argued that the insinuative phrases have misled historians. Doris Kearns Goodwin stated in her 1994 Pulitzer Prize–winning account of the Roosevelts that "whether Hick and Eleanor went beyond kisses and hugs" could not be determined with certainty. Roosevelt was close friends with several lesbian couples, such as Nancy Cook and Marion Dickerman, and Esther Lape and Elizabeth Fisher Read, suggesting that she understood lesbianism; Marie Souvestre, Roosevelt's childhood teacher and a great influence on her later thinking, was also a lesbian. Faber published some of Roosevelt and Hickok's correspondence in 1980, but concluded that the lovestruck phrasing was simply an "unusually belated schoolgirl crush" and warned historians not to be misled. Researcher Leila J. Rupp criticized Faber's argument, calling her book "a case study in homophobia" and arguing that Faber unwittingly presented "page after page of evidence that delineates the growth and development of a love affair between the two women." In 1992, Roosevelt biographer Blanche Wiesen Cook argued that the relationship was in fact romantic, generating national attention. A 2011 essay by Russell Baker reviewing two new Roosevelt biographies in the New York Review of Books (Franklin and Eleanor: An Extraordinary Marriage, by Hazel Rowley, and Eleanor Roosevelt: Transformative First Lady, by Maurine H. Beasley) stated, "That the Hickok relationship was indeed erotic now seems beyond dispute considering what is known about the letters they exchanged."

In the same years, Washington gossip linked Roosevelt romantically with New Deal administrator Harry Hopkins, with whom she worked closely. Roosevelt also had a close relationship with New York State Police sergeant Earl Miller, who was assigned by the president to be her bodyguard. Roosevelt was 44 years old when she met Miller, 32, in 1929. He became her friend as well as her official escort, teaching her different sports, such as diving and riding, and coached her in tennis. Biographer Blanche Wiesen Cook writes that Miller was Roosevelt's "first romantic involvement" in her middle years. Hazel Rowley concludes, "There is no doubt that Eleanor was in love with Earl for a time ... But they are most unlikely to have had an 'affair'."

Roosevelt's friendship with Miller occurred at the same time that her husband had a rumored relationship with his secretary, Marguerite "Missy" LeHand. Smith writes, "remarkably, both ER and Franklin recognized, accepted, and encouraged the arrangement... Eleanor and Franklin were strong-willed people who cared greatly for each other's happiness but realized their own inability to provide for it." Roosevelt and Miller's relationship is said to have continued until her death in 1962. They are thought to have corresponded daily, but all letters have been lost. According to rumor, the letters were anonymously purchased and destroyed, or locked away when she died.

Roosevelt was a longtime friend of Carrie Chapman Catt and gave her the Chi Omega award at the White House in 1941.

==== Attitudes toward Jewish people ====
Until middle age, Eleanor Roosevelt exhibited antisemitic tendencies. In a 1918 letter to her mother-in-law, she declared, the "Jew party [was] appalling.... I never wish to hear money, jewels or sables mentioned again." When she became co-owner of the Todhunter school in New York City, a limited number of Jews were admitted. Most students were upper-class Protestants, and Roosevelt said that the spirit of the school "would be different if we had too large a proportion of Jewish children." She said the problem was that "the country is still full of immigrant Jews, very unlike ourselves."

By 1929, however, when she made those statements, her social circle had begun to include a number of Jews, including Elinor and Henry Morgenthau Jr., Bernard Baruch, Edith and Herbert H. Lehman, and Rose Schneiderman. In the 1930s, once she had become first lady, she began speaking out against the growing antisemitism in Europe and the United States and advocating for allowing more Jewish refugees into the United States. However, according to historian Michelle Mart, while serving as first lady, "Although it is clear from all accounts that Roosevelt 'cared deeply' about the plight of European Jews, her public actions remained limited, and she refrained from pressing for radical policies to rescue the Jews."

After World War II she became a staunch champion of Israel, which she admired for its commitment to New Deal values.

== Public life before the White House ==
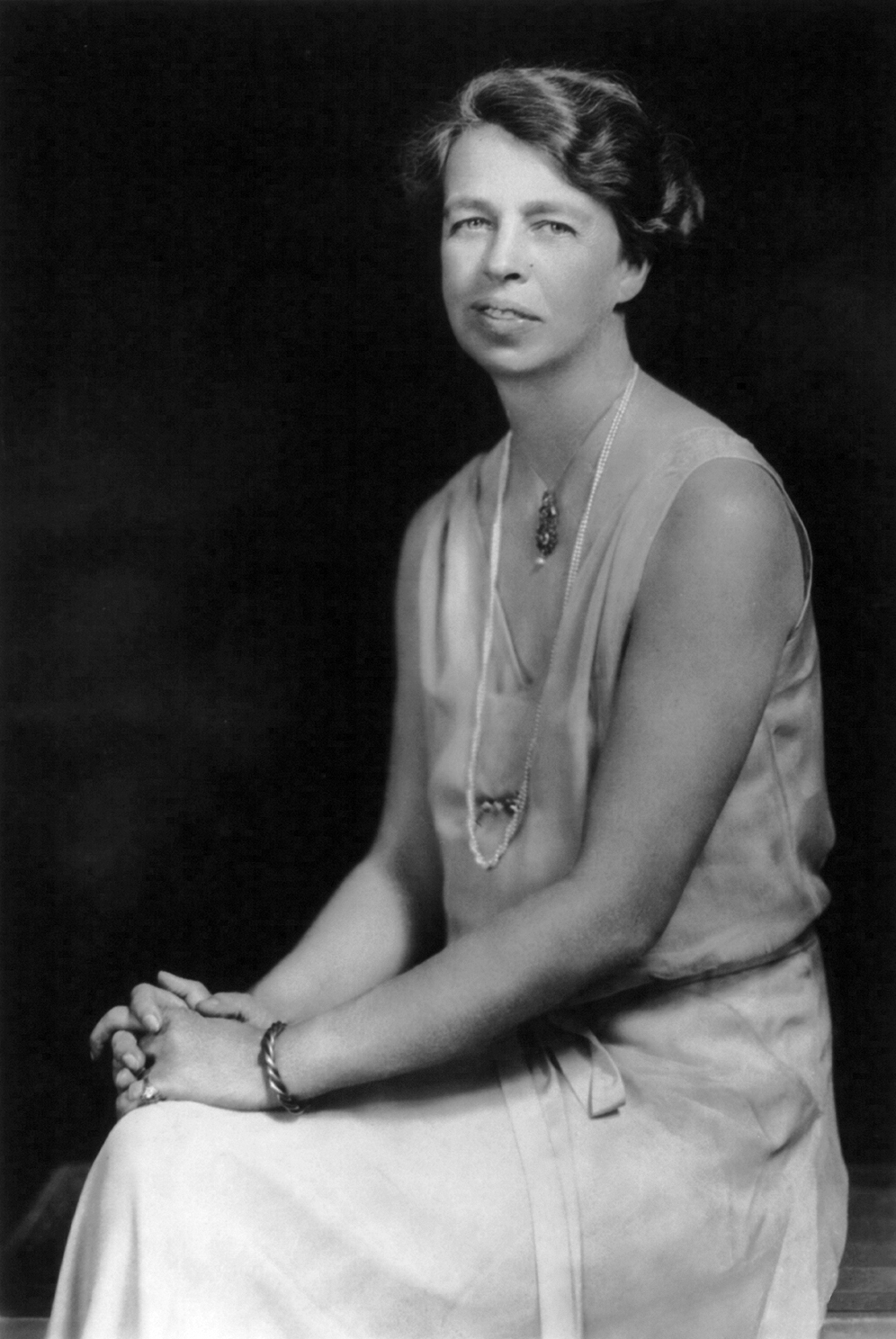
Roosevelt in 1932

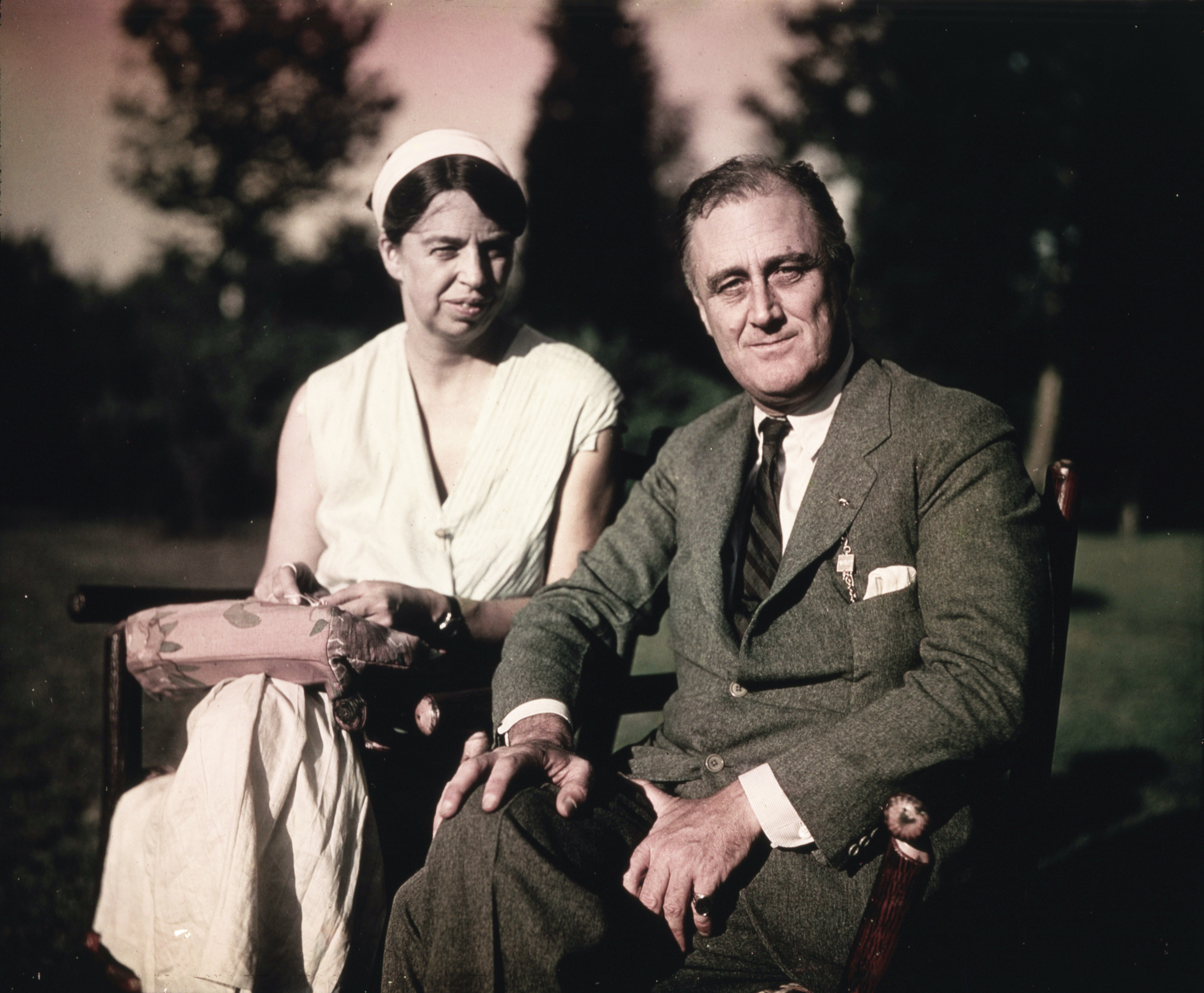
Eleanor and Franklin Roosevelt in August 1932

In the 1920 presidential election, Franklin was nominated as the running mate of Democratic presidential candidate James M. Cox. Roosevelt joined Franklin in touring the country, making her first campaign appearances. Cox was defeated by Republican Warren G. Harding, who won with 404 electoral votes to 127.

Following the onset of Franklin's paralytic illness in 1921, Roosevelt began serving as a stand-in for her incapacitated husband, making public appearances on his behalf, often carefully coached by Louis Howe. She also started working with the Women's Trade Union League (WTUL), raising funds in support of the union's goals: a 48-hour workweek, minimum wage, and the abolition of child labor. Throughout the 1920s, Roosevelt became increasingly influential as a leader in the New York State Democratic Party while Franklin used her contacts among Democratic women to strengthen his standing with them, winning their committed support for the future. In 1924, she campaigned for Democrat Alfred E. Smith in his successful re-election bid as governor of New York State against the Republican nominee and her first cousin Theodore Roosevelt Jr. Franklin had spoken out on Theodore's "wretched record" as Assistant Secretary of the Navy during the Teapot Dome scandal, and in return, Theodore said of him, "He's a maverick! He does not wear the brand of our family," which infuriated her. She dogged Theodore on the New York State campaign trail in a car fitted with a papier-mâché bonnet shaped like a giant teapot that was made to emit simulated steam (to remind voters of Theodore's supposed, but later disproved, connections to the scandal), and countered his speeches with those of her own, calling him immature. She would later decry these methods, admitting that they were below her dignity but saying that they had been contrived by Democratic Party "dirty tricksters." Theodore was defeated by 105,000 votes, and he never forgave her. By 1928, Roosevelt was promoting Smith's candidacy for president and Franklin's nomination as the Democratic Party's candidate for governor of New York, succeeding Smith. Although Smith lost the presidential race, Franklin won and the Roosevelts moved into the governor's mansion in Albany, New York. During Franklin's term as governor, Roosevelt traveled widely in the state to make speeches and inspect state facilities on his behalf, reporting her findings to him at the end of each trip.

In 1927, Roosevelt joined friends Marion Dickerman and Nancy Cook in buying the Todhunter School for Girls, a finishing school which also offered college preparatory courses, in New York City. At the school, she taught upper-level courses in American literature and history, emphasizing independent thought, current events, and social engagement. She continued to teach three days a week while Franklin served as governor, but was forced to leave teaching after his election as president.

Also in 1927, Roosevelt established Val-Kill Industries with Cook, Dickerman, and Caroline O'Day, three friends she met through her activities in the Women's Division of the New York State Democratic Party. It was located on the banks of a stream that flowed through the Roosevelt family estate in Hyde Park, New York. Roosevelt and her business partners financed the construction of a small factory to provide supplemental income for local farming families who would make furniture, pewter, and homespun cloth using traditional craft methods. Capitalizing on the popularity of the Colonial Revival, most Val-Kill products were modeled on eighteenth-century forms. Roosevelt promoted Val-Kill through interviews and public appearances. Val-Kill Industries never became the subsistence program that Roosevelt and her friends imagined, but it did pave the way for larger New Deal initiatives during Franklin's presidential administration. Cook's failing health and pressures from the Great Depression compelled the women to dissolve the partnership in 1938, at which time Roosevelt converted the shop buildings into a cottage at Val-Kill, that eventually became her permanent residence after Franklin died in 1945. Otto Berge acquired the contents of the factory and the use of the Val-Kill name to continue making colonial-style furniture until he retired in 1975. In 1977, Roosevelt's cottage at Val-Kill and its surrounding property of 181 acres (0.73 km2), was formally designated by an act of Congress as the Eleanor Roosevelt National Historic Site, "to commemorate for the education, inspiration, and benefit of present and future generations the life and work of an outstanding woman in American history."

== First Lady of the United States (1933–1945) ==
Roosevelt making an appeal for the Red Cross, May 22, 1940

Roosevelt became First Lady of the United States when Franklin was inaugurated on March 4, 1933. Having known all of the twentieth century's previous first ladies, she was seriously depressed at having to assume the role, which had traditionally been restricted to domesticity and hostessing. Her immediate predecessor, Lou Henry Hoover, had ended her feminist activism on becoming first lady, stating her intention to be only a "backdrop for Bertie." Eleanor's distress at these precedents was severe enough that Hickok subtitled her biography of Roosevelt "Reluctant First Lady".

With support from Howe and Hickok, Roosevelt set out to redefine the position. According to her biographer Blanche Wiesen Cook, she became "the most controversial First Lady in United States history" in the process. Despite criticism of them both, with her husband's strong support she continued with the active business and speaking agenda she had begun before assuming the role of first lady in an era when few married women had careers. She was the first presidential spouse to hold regular press conferences and became the first spouse to speak at a national party convention when she gave a speech at the 1940 Democratic National Convention. She also wrote a daily and widely syndicated newspaper column, "My Day", another first for a presidential spouse. She was also the first first lady to write a monthly magazine column and to host a weekly radio show.

In the first year of her husband's administration, Roosevelt was determined to match his presidential salary, and she earned $75,000 from her lectures and writing, most of which she gave to charity. By 1941, she was receiving lecture fees of $1,000, and was made an honorary member of Phi Beta Kappa at one of her lectures to celebrate her achievements.

Roosevelt maintained a heavy travel schedule in her twelve years in the White House, frequently making personal appearances at labor meetings to assure Depression-era workers that the White House was mindful of their plight. In one famous cartoon of the time from The New Yorker magazine (June 3, 1933), satirizing a visit she had made to a mine, an astonished coal miner, peering down a dark tunnel, says to a co-worker, "For gosh sakes, here comes Mrs. Roosevelt!"

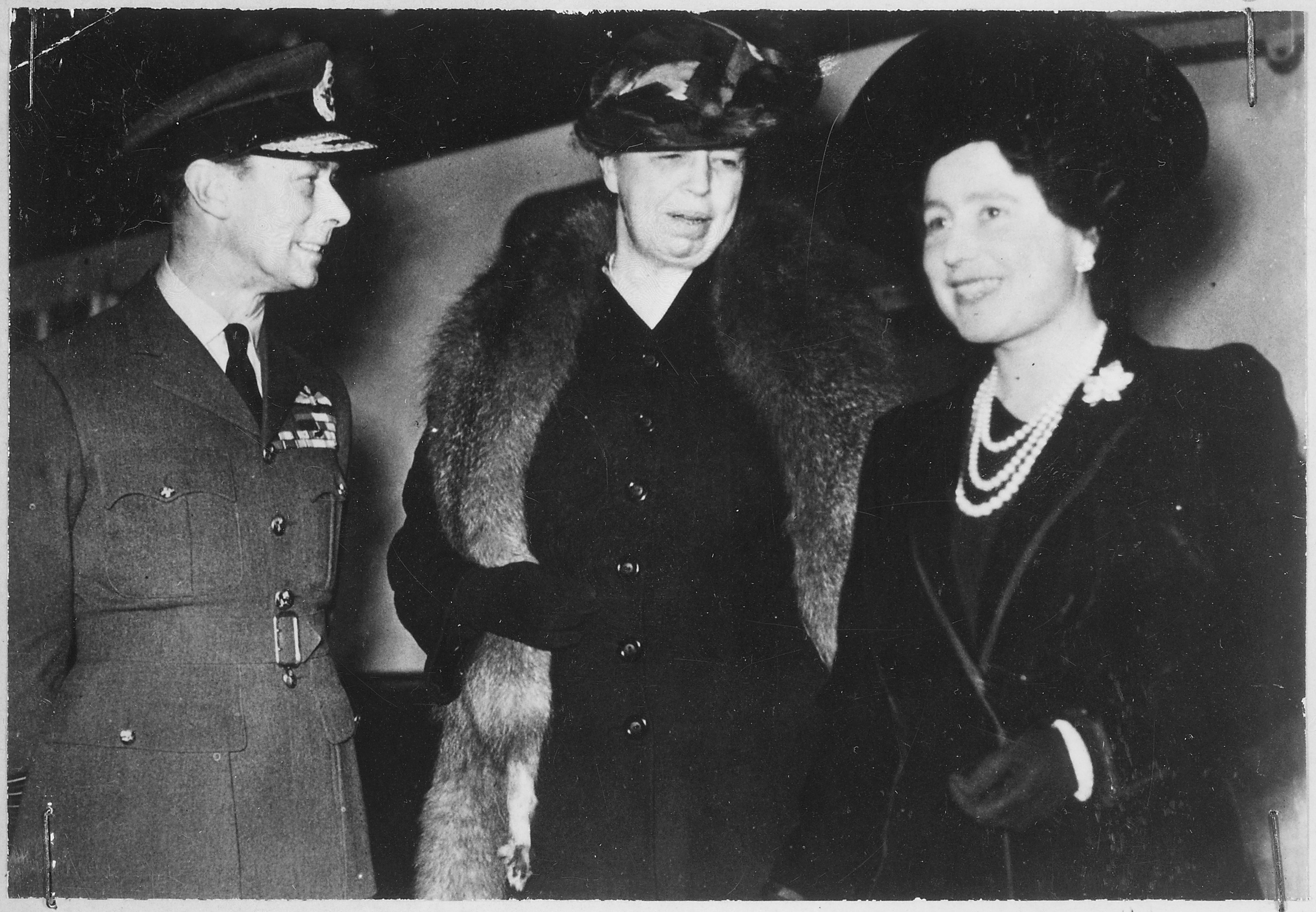
Roosevelt (center), King George VI and Queen Elizabeth in London, October 23, 1942

In early 1933, the "Bonus Army", a protest group of World War I veterans, marched on Washington for the second time in two years, calling for their veteran bonus certificates to be awarded early. The previous year, President Hoover had ordered them dispersed, and the U.S. Army cavalry charged and bombarded the veterans with tear gas. This time, Roosevelt visited the veterans at their muddy campsite, listening to their concerns and singing army songs with them. The meeting defused the tension between the veterans and the administration, and one of the marchers later commented, "Hoover sent the Army. [President] Roosevelt sent his wife."

In 1933, after she became first lady, a new hybrid tea rose was named after her (Rosa x hybrida "Mrs. Franklin D. Roosevelt").

In 1937, she began writing her autobiography, all volumes of which were compiled into The Autobiography of Eleanor Roosevelt in 1961 (Harper & Brothers, ISBN 0-306-80476-X).

=== American Youth Congress and National Youth Administration ===
The American Youth Congress (AYC) was formed in 1935 to advocate for youth rights in U.S. politics, and it was responsible for introducing the American Youth Bill of Rights to the U.S. Congress. Roosevelt's relationship with the AYC eventually led to the formation of the National Youth Administration, a New Deal agency in the United States, founded in 1935, that focused on providing work and education for Americans between the ages of 16 and 25. The NYA was headed by Aubrey Willis Williams, a prominent liberal from Alabama who was close to Roosevelt and Harry Hopkins. Speaking of the NYA in the 1930s, Roosevelt expressed her concern about ageism, stating that "I live in real terror when I think we may be losing this generation. We have got to bring these young people into the active life of the community and make them feel that they are necessary." In 1939 the Dies Committee subpoenaed leaders of the AYC, who, in addition to serving the AYC, also were members of the Young Communist League. Roosevelt was in attendance at the hearings and afterward invited the subpoenaed witnesses to board at the White House during their stay in Washington D.C. Joseph P. Lash was one of her boarders. On February 10, 1940, members of the AYC, as guests of Roosevelt in her capacity as first lady, attended a picnic on the White House lawn where they were addressed by Franklin from the South Portico. The President admonished them to condemn not merely the Nazi regime but all dictatorships. The President was reportedly booed by the group. Afterwards, many of the same youth picketed the White House as representatives of the American Peace Mobilization. Among them was Joseph Cadden, one of Roosevelt's overnight boarders. Later in 1940, despite Roosevelt's publication of her reasons "Why I still believe in the Youth Congress," the American Youth Congress was disbanded. The NYA was shut down in 1943.

=== Arthurdale ===
Roosevelt's chief project during her husband's first two terms was the establishment of a planned community in Arthurdale, West Virginia. On August 18, 1933, at Hickok's urging, Roosevelt visited the families of homeless miners in Morgantown, West Virginia, who had been blacklisted following union activities. Deeply affected by the visit, Roosevelt proposed a resettlement community for the miners at Arthurdale, where they could make a living by subsistence farming, handicrafts, and a local manufacturing plant. She hoped the project could become a model for "a new kind of community" in the U.S., in which workers would be better cared for. Her husband enthusiastically supported the project.

After an initial, disastrous experiment with prefab houses, construction began again in 1934 to Roosevelt's specifications, this time with "every modern convenience", including indoor plumbing and central steam heat. Families occupied the first fifty homes in June, and agreed to repay the government in thirty years' time. Though Roosevelt had hoped for a racially mixed community, the miners insisted on limiting membership to white Christians. After losing a community vote, Roosevelt recommended the creation of other communities for the excluded black and Jewish miners. The experience motivated Roosevelt to become much more outspoken on the issue of racial discrimination.

Roosevelt remained a vigorous fundraiser for the community for several years, as well as spending most of her own income on the project. However, the project was criticized by both the political left and right. Conservatives condemned it as socialist and a "communist plot", while Democratic members of Congress opposed government competition with private enterprise. Secretary of the Interior Harold Ickes also opposed the project, citing its high per-family cost. Arthurdale continued to sink as a government spending priority for the federal government until 1941, when the U.S. sold off the last of its holdings in the community at a loss.

Later commentators generally described the Arthurdale experiment as a failure. Roosevelt herself was sharply discouraged by a 1940 visit in which she felt the town had become excessively dependent on outside assistance. However, the residents considered the town a "utopia" compared to their previous circumstances, and many were returned to economic self-sufficiency. Roosevelt personally considered the project a success, later speaking of the improvements she saw in people's lives there and stating, "I don't know whether you think that is worth half a million dollars. But I do."

=== Civil rights activism ===
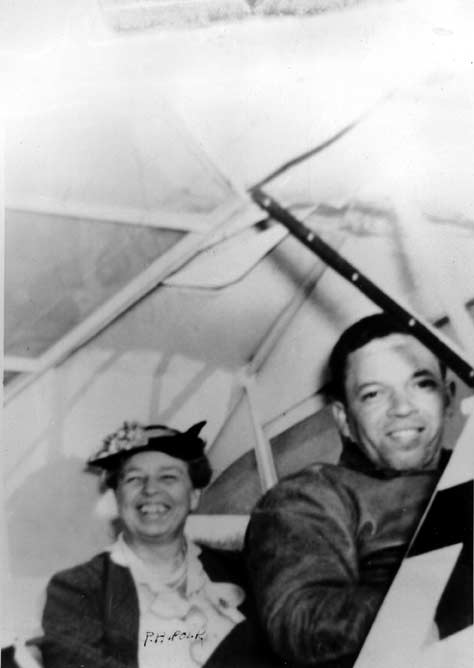
Roosevelt flying with Tuskegee Airman C. Alfred "Chief" Anderson in March 1941

Roosevelt is seen by historians as having been significantly more advanced than her husband on civil rights. During Franklin's administration, Roosevelt became an important connection to the African-American population in the era of segregation. Despite the President's desire to placate Southern sentiment, Roosevelt was vocal in her support of the civil rights movement. After her experience with Arthurdale and her inspections of New Deal programs in Southern states, she concluded that New Deal programs were discriminating against African-Americans, who received a disproportionately small share of relief money. Roosevelt became one of the only voices in her husband's administration insisting that benefits be equally extended to Americans of all races.

Roosevelt also broke with tradition by inviting hundreds of African-American guests to the White House. In 1936 she became aware of conditions at the National Training School for Girls, a predominantly Black reform school once located in the Palisades neighborhood of Washington, D.C. She visited the school, wrote about it in her "My Day" column, lobbied for additional funding, and pressed for changes in staffing and curriculum. Her White House invitation to the students became an issue in Franklin's 1936 re-election campaign. When the Black singer Marian Anderson was denied the use of Washington's Constitution Hall by the Daughters of the American Revolution in 1939, Roosevelt resigned from the group in protest and helped arrange another concert on the steps of the Lincoln Memorial.

African American author Zora Neale Hurston criticized Roosevelt, however, for failing to challenge the decision of the Board of Education of DC, now called the District of Columbia State Board of Education, to simultaneously deny Anderson a singing venue at the auditorium of the all-white Central High School. "As far as the high-school auditorium is concerned," Hurston declared "to jump the people responsible for racial bias would be to accuse and expose the accusers themselves. The District of Columbia has no home rule; it is controlled by congressional committees, and Congress at the time was overwhelmingly Democratic. It was controlled by the very people who were screaming so loudly against the DAR. To my way of thinking, both places should have been denounced, or neither." The Board retained its policy of exclusion long after Anderson's concert at the Lincoln Memorial.

Roosevelt later presented Anderson to the King and Queen of the United Kingdom after Anderson performed at a White House dinner. Roosevelt also arranged the appointment of African-American educator Mary McLeod Bethune, with whom she had struck up a friendship, as Director of the Division of Negro Affairs of the National Youth Administration. To avoid problems with the staff when Bethune would visit the White House, Roosevelt would meet her at the gate, embrace her, and walk in with her arm-in-arm.

She was involved by being "the eyes and the ears" of the New Deal. She looked to the future and was committed to social reform. One of those programs helped working women receive better wages. The New Deal also placed women into less machine work and more white-collar work. Women did not have to work in the factories making war supplies because men were coming home so they could take over the long days and nights women had been working to contribute to the war efforts. Roosevelt brought unprecedented activism and ability to the role of the first lady.

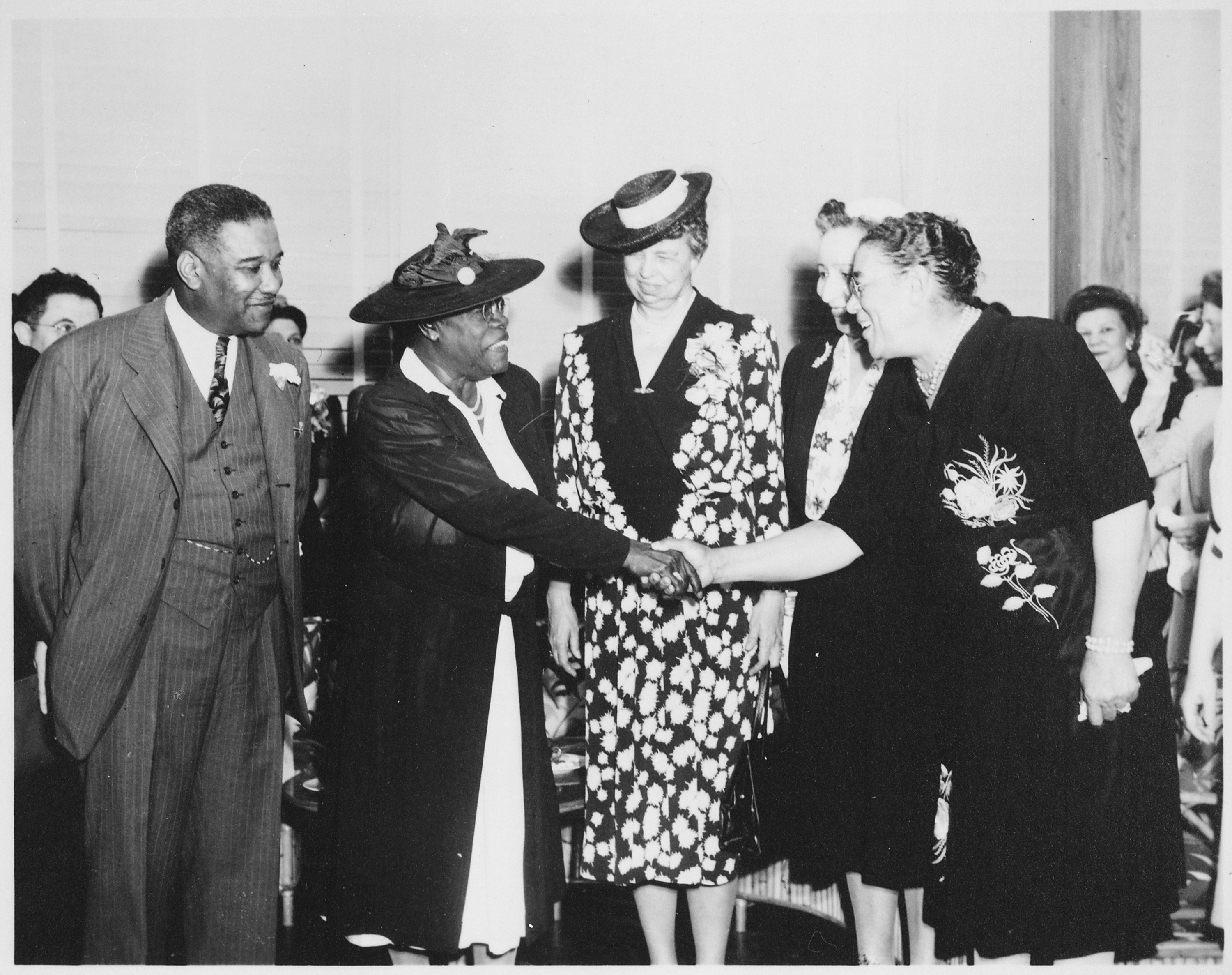
Roosevelt and Mary McLeod Bethune, a member of the Black Cabinet, formed by African American federal employees, 1943

In contrast to her usual support of African-American rights, the "sundown town" Eleanor, in West Virginia, was named for her and was established in 1934 when she and Franklin visited the county and developed it as a test site for families. As a "sundown town", like other Franklin Roosevelt towns around the nation (such as Greenbelt, Greenhills, Greendale, Hanford, or Norris), it was for whites only. It was established as a New Deal project.

Roosevelt lobbied behind the scenes for the 1934 Costigan–Wagner Bill to make lynching a federal crime, including arranging a meeting between Franklin and NAACP president Walter Francis White. Fearing he would lose the votes of Southern congressional delegations for his legislative agenda, however, Franklin refused to publicly support the bill, which proved unable to pass the Senate. In 1942, Roosevelt worked with activist Pauli Murray to persuade Franklin to appeal on behalf of sharecropper Odell Waller, convicted of killing a white farmer during a fight; though Franklin sent a letter to Virginia Governor Colgate Darden urging him to commute the sentence to life imprisonment, Waller was executed as scheduled.

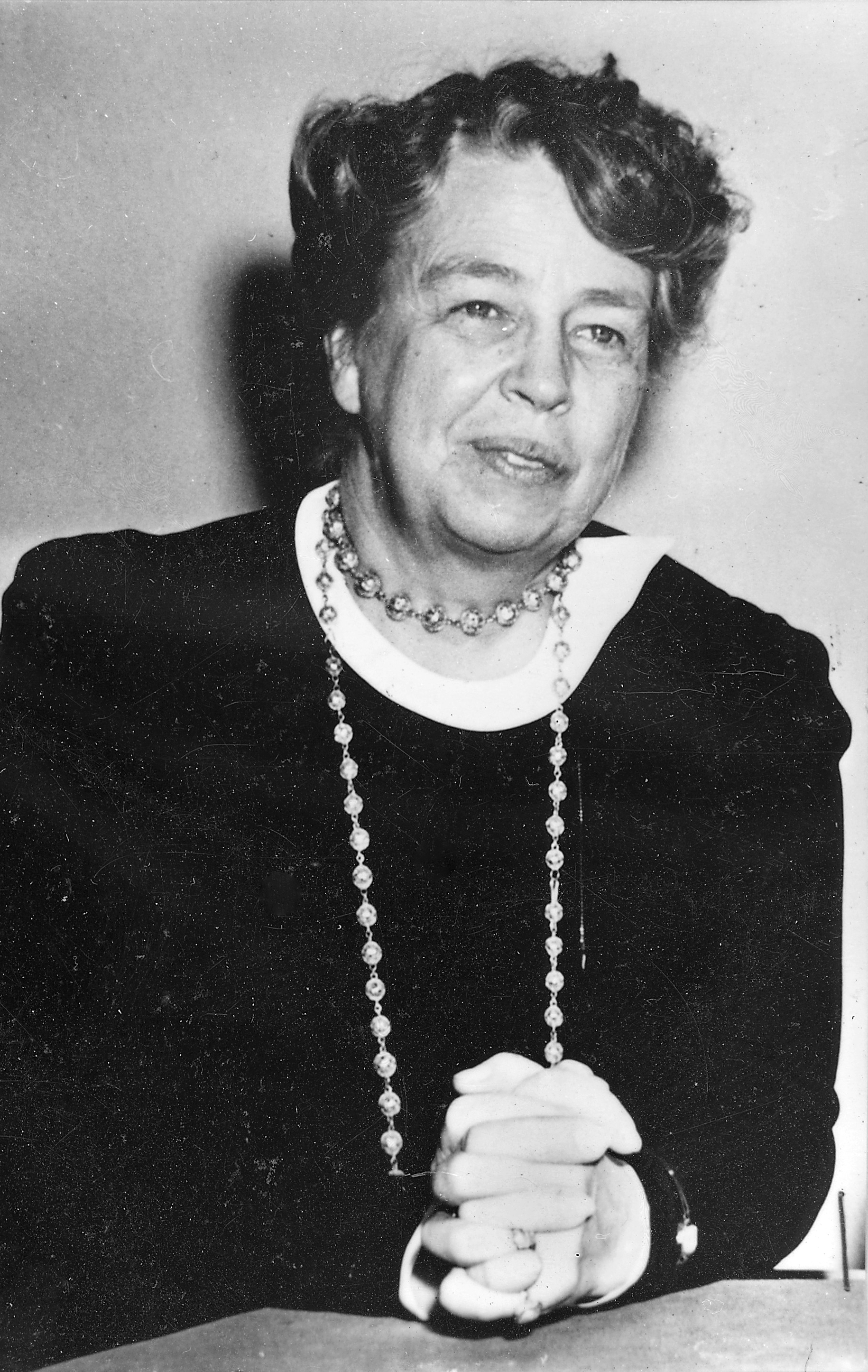
Eleanor Roosevelt in 1943

Roosevelt's support of African-American rights made her an unpopular figure among whites in the South. Rumors spread of "Eleanor Clubs" formed by servants to oppose their employers and "Eleanor Tuesdays" on which African-American men would knock down white women on the street, though no evidence has ever been found of either practice. When race riots broke out in Detroit in June 1943, critics in both the North and South wrote that Roosevelt was to blame. At the same time, she grew so popular among African-Americans, previously a reliable Republican voting bloc, that they became a consistent base of support for the Democratic Party.

During the war, however, Roosevelt failed to help labor leader A. Philip Randolph after E.H. Crump, the Democratic Boss of Memphis and a close ally and friend of the president, quite openly violated his constitutional rights. In 1943, Randolph had launched a personal campaign for free speech in Memphis in response to Crump's use of strong-arm and political pressure tactics to drive two prominent local black Republicans, J.B. Martin and Randolph's friend Robert Church Jr. from the city. When Randolph came to the city, Crump had denied him venues and intimidated local black leaders by threatening them with jail into withdrawing speaking invitations. Randolph urged Roosevelt, who had also friendly political ties with Crump, to do something to counter Crump's "fascist" denial of free speech, but she refused. Her reply to Randolph on December 18 read in full: "I referred your letter to a friend of mine when I received it and I am sorry it has not been answered before. I was advised not to do anything, as it might do more harm than good."

Following the Japanese attack on Pearl Harbor on December 7, 1941, Roosevelt spoke out against Japanese-American prejudice, warning against the "great hysteria against minority groups." She also privately opposed her husband's Executive Order 9066, which required Japanese-Americans in many areas of the U.S. to enter internment camps. She was widely criticized for her defense of Japanese-American citizens, including a call by the Los Angeles Times that she be "forced to retire from public life" over her stand on the issue.

=== Norvelt ===
On May 21, 1937, Roosevelt visited Westmoreland Homesteads to mark the arrival of the community's final homesteader. Accompanying her on the trip was Elinor Morgenthau, the wife of Henry Morgenthau Jr., the president's Secretary of the Treasury. "I am no believer in paternalism. I do not like charities," Eleanor Roosevelt had said earlier. But cooperative communities such as Westmoreland Homesteads, she went on, offered an alternative to "our rather settled ideas" that could "provide equality of opportunity for all and prevent the recurrence of a similar disaster [depression] in the future." Residents were so taken by her personal expression of interest in the program that they promptly agreed to rename the community in her honor. (The new town name, Norvelt, was a combination of the last syllables in her names: EleaNOR RooseVELT.) The Norvelt firefighter's hall is named Roosevelt Hall in her honor.

=== Use of media ===
Eleanor Roosevelt, George T. Bye (her literary agent, upper right), Deems Taylor (upper left), Westbrook Pegler (lower left), Quaker Lake, Pawling, New York (home of Lowell Thomas), 1938

Roosevelt was an unprecedentedly outspoken First Lady who made far more use of the media than her predecessors; she held 348 press conferences over the span of her husband's 12-year presidency. Inspired by her relationship with Hickok, Roosevelt placed a ban on male reporters attending the press conferences, effectively forcing newspapers to keep female reporters on staff in order to cover them. She relaxed the rule only once, on her return from her 1943 Pacific trip. Because the Gridiron Club banned women from its annual Gridiron Dinner for journalists, Roosevelt hosted a competing event for female reporters at the White House, which she called "Gridiron Widows". She was interviewed by many newspapers; the New Orleans journalist Iris Kelso described Roosevelt as her most interesting interviewee ever. In the early days of her all-female press conferences, she said they would not address "politics, legislation, or executive decision", since the role of the First Lady was expected to be non-political at that time. She also agreed at first that she would avoid discussing her views on pending congressional measures. Still, the press conferences provided a welcome opportunity for the women reporters to speak directly with the first lady, access that had been unavailable in previous administrations.

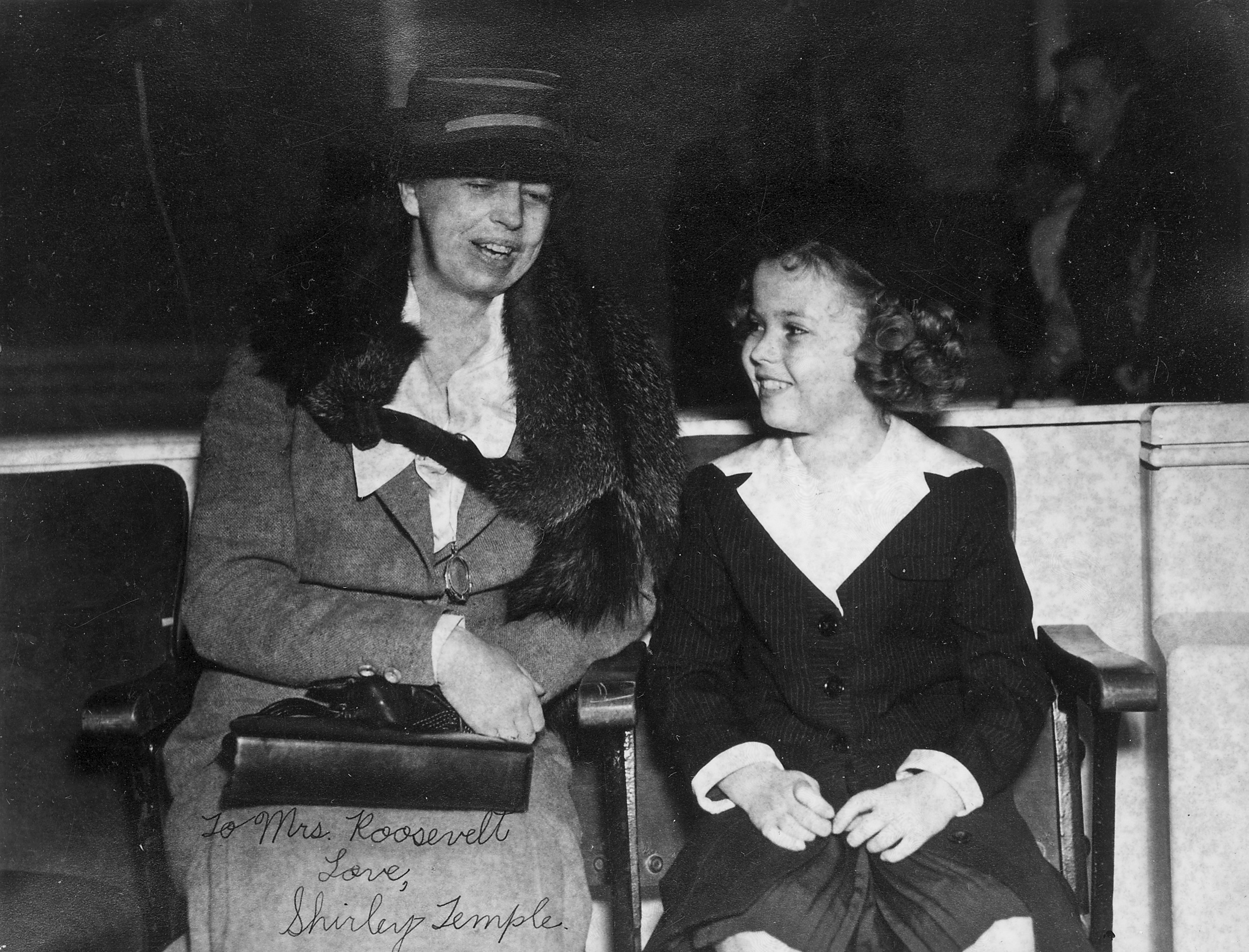
Roosevelt with Shirley Temple in 1938

Just before Franklin assumed the presidency in February 1933, Roosevelt published an editorial in the Women's Daily News that conflicted so sharply with his intended public spending policies that he published a rejoinder in the following issue. On entering the White House, she signed a contract with the magazine Woman's Home Companion to provide a monthly column, in which she answered mail sent to her by readers; the feature was canceled in 1936 as another presidential election approached. She continued her articles in other venues, publishing more than sixty articles in national magazines during her tenure as first lady. Roosevelt also began a syndicated newspaper column, titled "My Day", which appeared six days a week from 1936 to her death in 1962. In the column, she wrote about her daily activities but also her humanitarian concerns. Hickok and George T. Bye, Roosevelt's literary agent, encouraged her to write the column. From 1941 to her death in 1962, she also wrote an advice column, If You Ask Me, first published in Ladies Home Journal and then later in McCall's. A selection of her columns was compiled in the book If You Ask Me: Essential Advice from Eleanor Roosevelt in 2018.

Beasley has argued that Roosevelt's publications, which often dealt with women's issues and invited reader responses, represented a conscious attempt to use journalism "to overcome social isolation" for women by making "public communication a two-way channel".

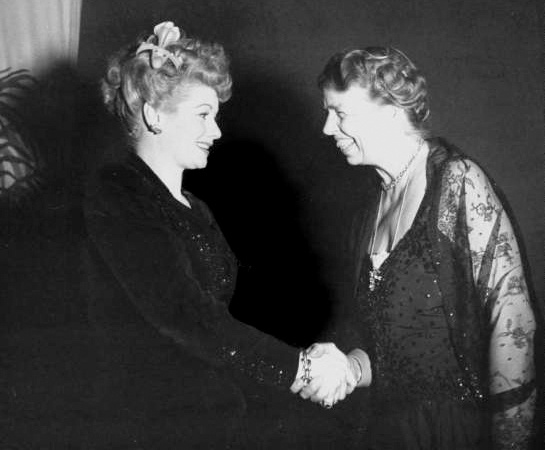
With Lucille Ball during a tour of Washington D.C. hotels presenting fundraisers for the President's Birthday Ball to fight infantile paralysis (1944)

Roosevelt also made extensive use of radio. She was not the first first lady to broadcast—her predecessor, Lou Henry Hoover, had done that already. But Hoover did not have a regular radio program, whereas Roosevelt did. She first broadcast her own programs of radio commentary beginning on July 9, 1934. On that first show, she talked about the effect of movies on children, the need for a censor who could make sure movies did not glorify crime and violence, and her opinion about the recent All-Star baseball game. She also read a commercial from a mattress company, which sponsored the broadcast. She said she would not accept any salary for being on the air, and that she would donate the amount ($3,000) to charity. Later that year, in November 1934, she broadcast a series of programs about children's education; it was heard on the CBS Radio Network. Sponsored by a typewriter company, Roosevelt once again donated the money, giving it to the American Friends Service Committee, to help with a school it operated. During 1934, Roosevelt set a record for the most times a first lady had spoken on radio: she spoke as a guest on other people's programs, as well as the host of her own, for a total of 28 times that year. In 1935, Roosevelt continued to host programs aimed at the female audience, including one called "It's A Woman's World." Each time, she donated the money she earned to charity. The association of a sponsor with the popular first lady resulted in increases in sales for that company: when the Selby Shoe Company sponsored a series of Roosevelt's programs, sales increased by 200%. The fact that her programs were sponsored created controversy, with her husband's political enemies expressing skepticism about whether she really did donate her salary to charity; they accused her of "profiteering." But her radio programs proved to be so popular with listeners that the criticisms had little effect. She continued to broadcast throughout the 1930s, sometimes on CBS and sometimes on NBC.

=== Use of media: film and television ===
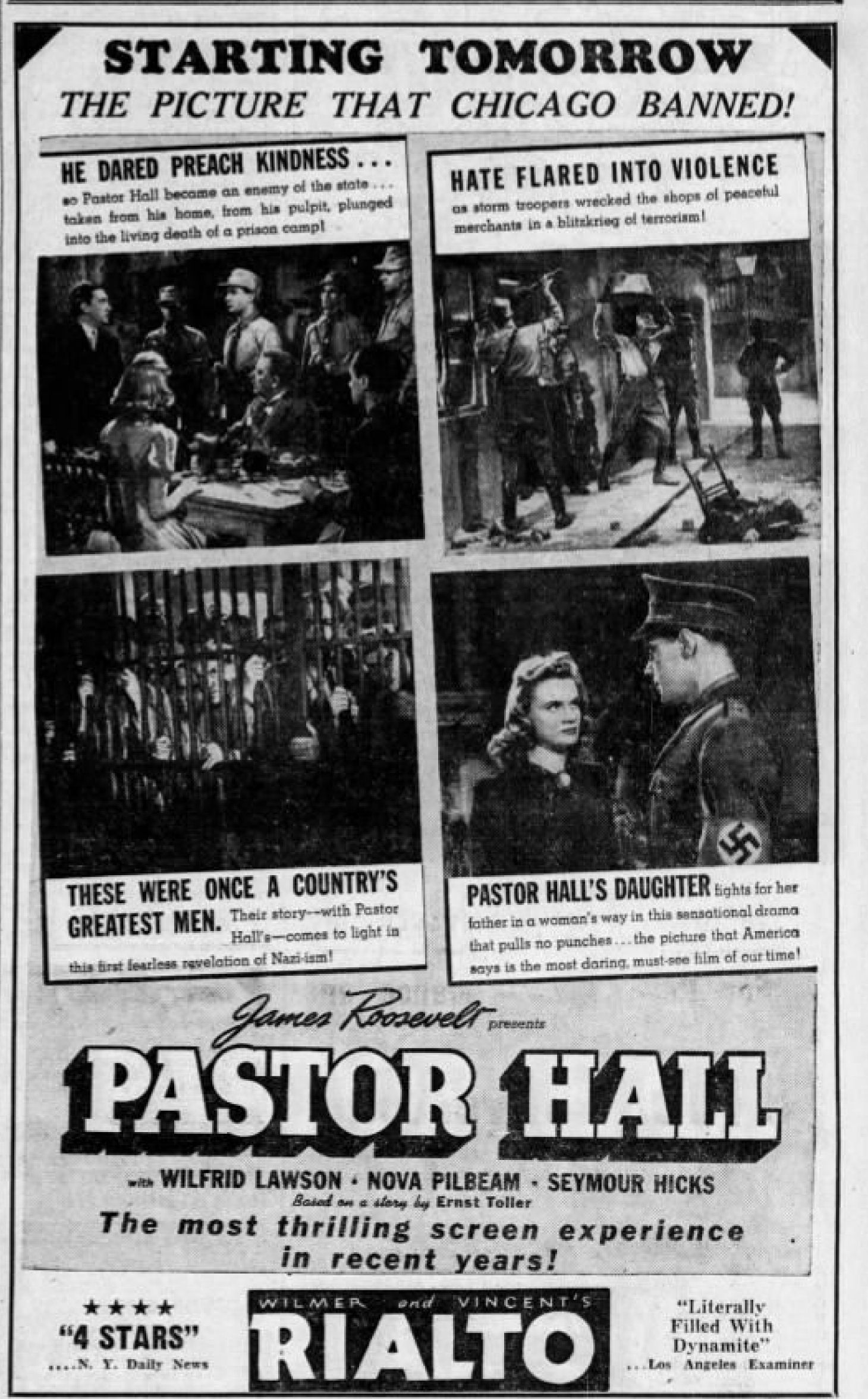
Pastor Hall (1940). Distribution in the US by James Roosevelt with filmed introduction by Eleanor Roosevelt.

Film and television offered Roosevelt even greater power to shape public opinion and expand public thinking. In the latter part of her life, she made over two hundred appearances in film and television as First Lady and in private life. Roosevelt's film career began with print in 1932 as she wrote articles for popular movie fan magazines such as Modern Screen and Photoplay and engaged readers on important issues with stories like Democracy on the Screen, Why We Roosevelts are Movie Fans, and How the Movies Can Help Keep Us Out of War. In her daily newspaper column "My Day" she never hesitated to recommend favored movies, and later she even lent her name for advertising films of which she approved. Actual movie debuts on screen came in 1940, first in the short film Hobby Lobby, which The New Yorker quipped was "Mrs. Roosevelt's first adventure as a motion-picture actress", and then in a role narrating the prologue for the anti-Nazi film Pastor Hall. Her son James Roosevelt, a producer in Hollywood, enlisted her help with Pastor Hall when the film was having trouble passing Hays Code restrictions against propaganda. Roosevelt also tried her hand at screenwriting, producing the script for a civil defense film, Women in Defense, narrated by Katharine Hepburn, directed by John Ford, and nominated for an Academy Award for Best Documentary Short. Roosevelt also narrated another civil defense film, Training Women for War Production. The 1950 short film My Trip Abroad, was used by Roosevelt to report on the Marshall Plan rebuilding efforts in Europe.

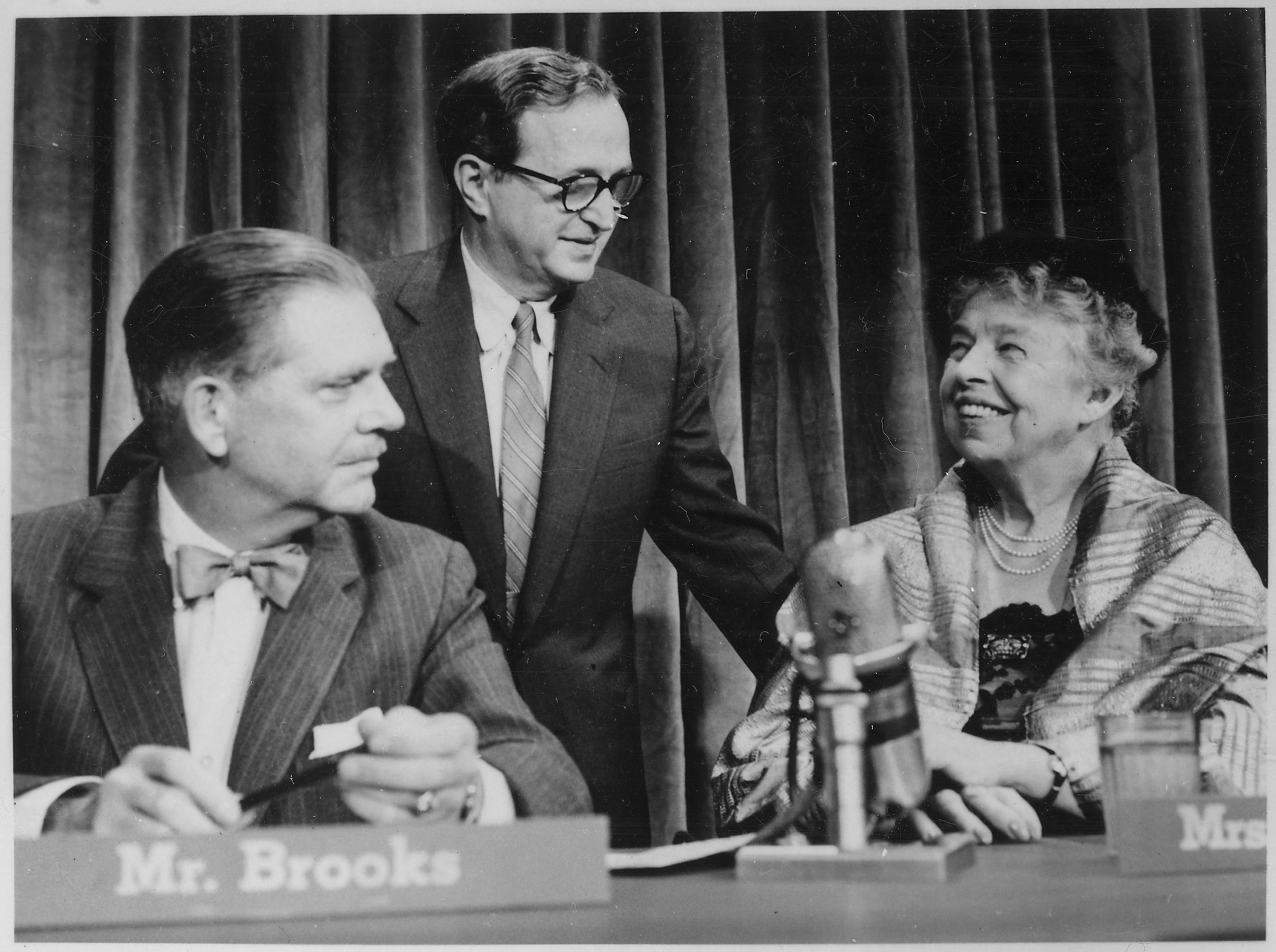
Meet the Press (1956) with journalists Ned Brooks, and Lawrence Spivak

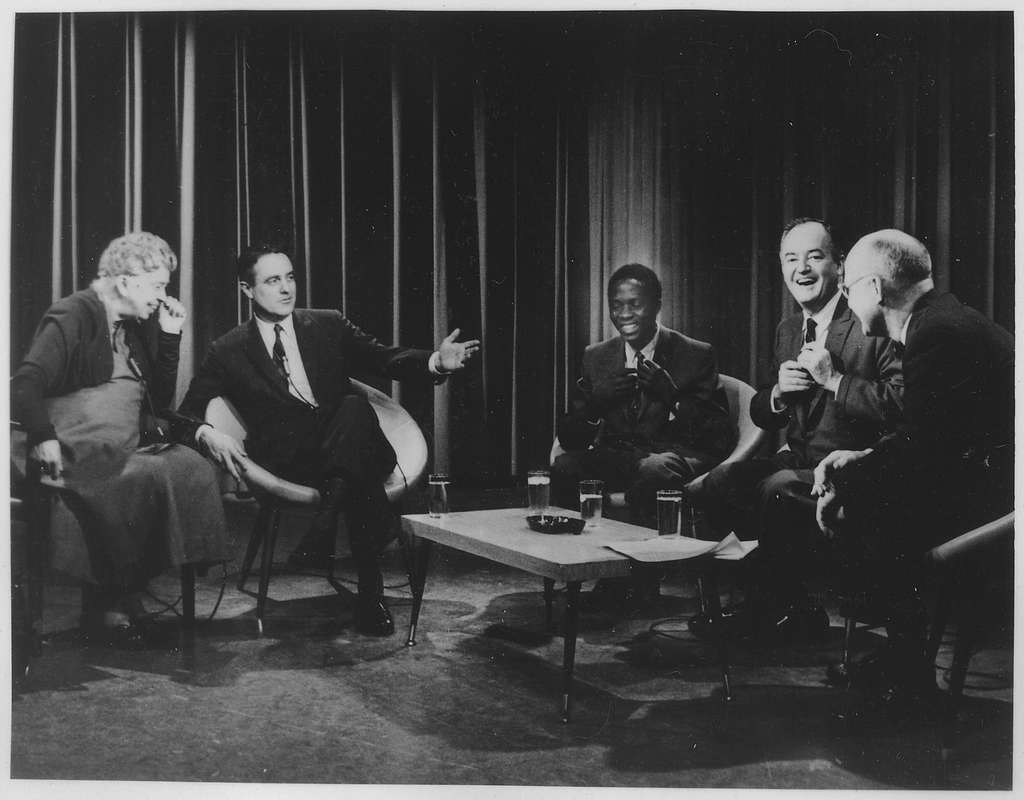
Prospects of Mankind (1961) Eleanor Roosevelt, moderator, with Sargent Shriver of the Peace Corp, Senteza Kajubi of Uganda (center), and Senator Hubert Humphrey (smiling).

An early adopter of television, Roosevelt made her small screen debut on the afternoon following VE Day 1945, and the First Lady warned viewers against apathy and war-weariness. Five years later, she was the first woman to host a major American public affairs broadcast television show, Today with Mrs. Roosevelt, a weekly program on NBC launched by her son Elliott. Albert Einstein and J Robert Oppenheimer were guests on the premiere episode, and it was Einstein's first time on television. (Roosevelt didn't always get her way. When she announced Paul Robeson as an upcoming guest, conservatives swiftly put pressure on the network to cancel his appearance.) A second NBC show followed in 1951, Mrs. Roosevelt Meets the Public. Aside from her own shows, Roosevelt played a significant role through television guest spots appearing with Sarah Churchill, Arlene Francis, Bob Hope, Edward R. Murrow, Jack Paar, Frank Sinatra, Ed Sullivan, and Mike Wallace, as well as several turns on Meet the Press. She even participated as the mystery guest on game show What's My Line? to promote United Nations Day. Another first for Roosevelt and American women was her appearance on Face the Nation with Republican Senator Margaret Chase Smith. Face the Nation had never featured women guests nor had they devoted a show to the topic of presidential candidates. Roosevelt and Smith debated the merits of candidates Adlai Stevenson versus Dwight Eisenhower in the 1956 presidential election. In 1959 Roosevelt began hosting Prospects of Mankind, a monthly talk show on National Educational Television, a precursor of PBS. Underwritten by the Ford Foundation with donations from individuals like Dore Schary, the show's advisory committee included Henry Kissinger. It attracted some of the most influential, global figures of the era, including John F. Kennedy on the day that he announced his candidacy for president, Ralph Bunche, and Bertrand Russell. Taped in different locations, including college campuses, European television stations and the United Nations, the format involved as many as four or five guests discussing one international affairs topic. In most cases, Roosevelt, the host and sometimes moderator, was the only woman on screen. Prospects of Mankind ran until right before Roosevelt's death in 1962.

Film and television also allowed Roosevelt the opportunity to expand the persona she had built in radio and print as the wise, informative, trustworthy American woman and use it for influence and commercial success. As one example, her television support of John F. Kennedy was so important, it may well have nudged his "hairline victory" over the line in the 1960 Presidential election. Roosevelt wasn't shy about using influence to benefit the entertainment industry careers of her children by lending her name to their projects, and in the case of Elliott, making him her agent for a time. Media appearances might serve two purposes, as in the case of her prologue to the anti-Nazi film Pastor Hall, which was distributed by son John's production company or in the case of Good Luck Margarine, when David Ogilvy paid her more than a quarter of a million dollars in today's currency to make a TV commercial in which Roosevelt also manages to mention world hunger. Other times, appearances were purely commercial. In 1949 CBS hired her for their 1949 televised Baking Contest Awards, where she stood alongside Philip and John S Pillsbury, Arthur Godfrey, and Art Linkletter as she handed out the $70,000 in cash prizes and promoted General Electric stoves. Roosevelt welcomed the revenue her media influence bought, most of which went to charity.

=== World War II ===
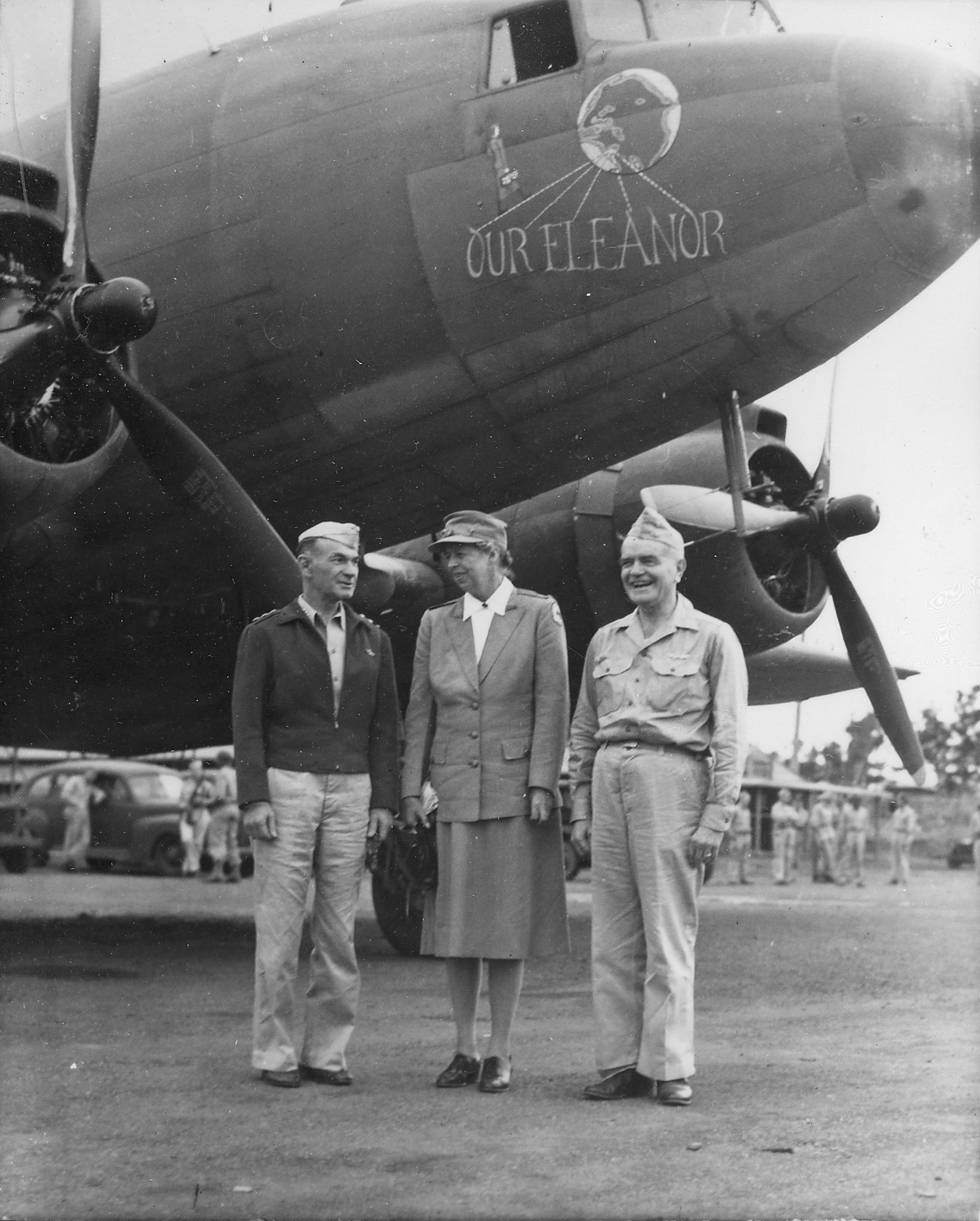
Gen. Millard Harmon, Eleanor Roosevelt and Admiral Halsey in the South Pacific Theater, 1943

On May 10, 1940, Germany invaded Belgium, Luxembourg, and the Netherlands, marking the end of the relatively conflict-free "Phoney War" phase of World War II. As the U.S. began to move toward war footing, Roosevelt found herself again depressed, fearing that her role in fighting for domestic justice would become extraneous in a nation focused on foreign affairs. She briefly considered traveling to Europe to work with the Red Cross, but was dissuaded by presidential advisers who pointed out the consequences should the president's wife be captured as a prisoner of war. She soon found other wartime causes to work on, however, beginning with a popular movement to allow the immigration of European refugee children. She also lobbied her husband to allow greater immigration of groups persecuted by the Nazis, including Jews, but fears of fifth columnists caused Franklin to restrict immigration rather than expanding it. Roosevelt successfully secured political refugee status for eighty-three Jewish refugees from the S.S. Quanza in August 1940, but was refused on many other occasions. Her son James later wrote that "her deepest regret at the end of her life" was that she had not forced Franklin to accept more refugees from Nazism during the war.

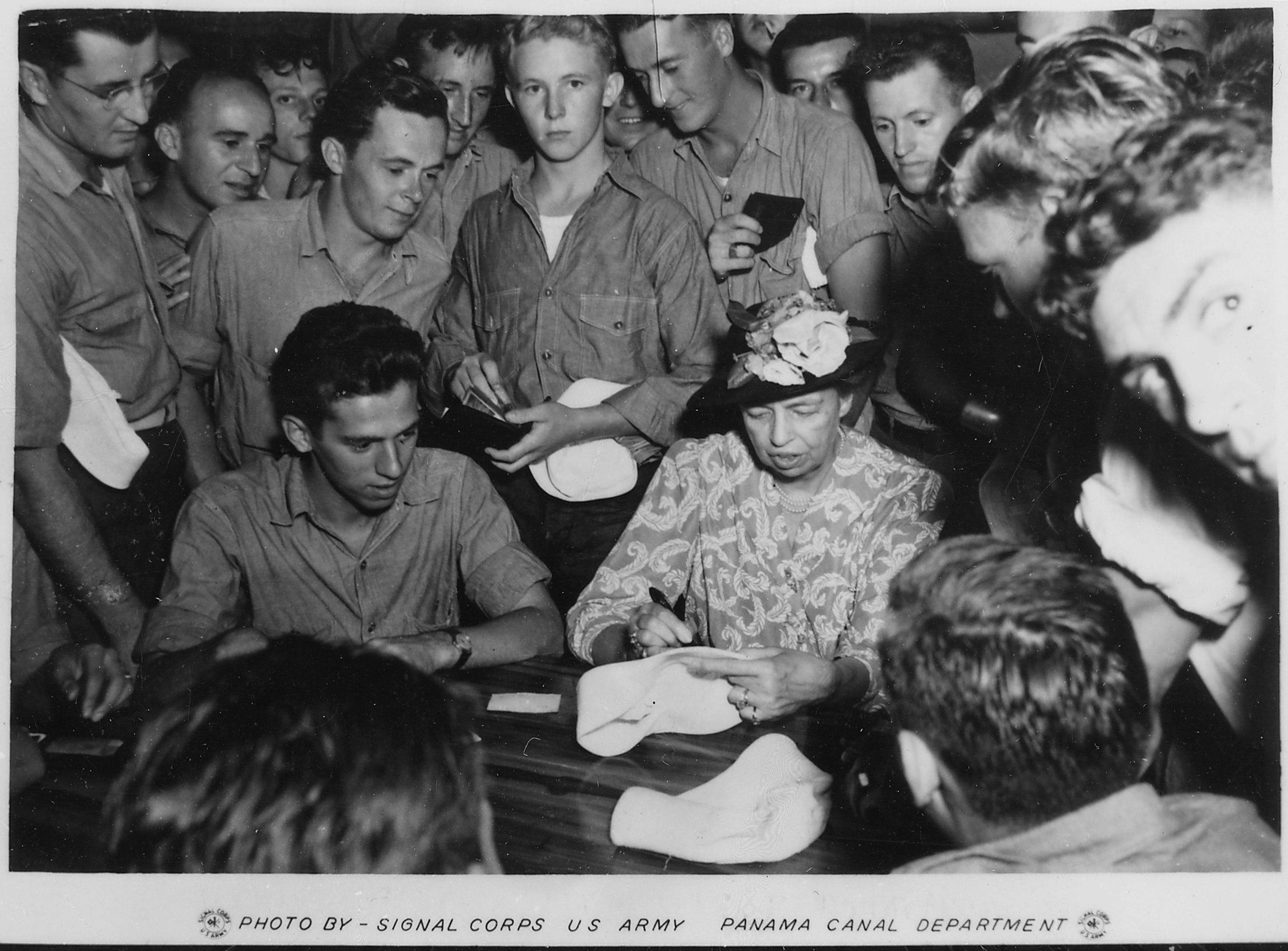
Roosevelt visiting troops

Roosevelt was also active on the home front. Beginning in 1941, she co-chaired the Office of Civilian Defense (OCD) with New York City Mayor Fiorello H. LaGuardia, working to give civilian volunteers expanded roles in war preparations. She soon found herself in a power struggle with LaGuardia, who preferred to focus on narrower aspects of defense, while she saw solutions to broader social problems as equally important to the war effort. Though LaGuardia resigned from the OCD in December 1941, Roosevelt was forced to resign following anger in the House of Representatives over high salaries for several OCD appointments, including two of her close friends.

Also in 1941, the short film Women in Defense, written by Roosevelt, was released. It was produced by the Office of Emergency Management and briefly outlines the way in which women could help prepare the country for the possibility of war. There is also a segment on the types of costumes women would wear while engaged in war work. At the end of the film, the narrator explains women are vital to securing a healthy American home life and raising children "which has always been the first line of defense".

In October 1942, Roosevelt toured England, visiting with American troops and inspecting British forces. Her visits drew enormous crowds and received almost unanimously favorable press in both England and America. In August 1943, she visited American troops in the South Pacific on a morale-building tour, of which Admiral William Halsey Jr. later said, "she alone accomplished more good than any other person, or any groups of civilians, who had passed through my area." For her part, Roosevelt was left shaken and deeply depressed by seeing the war's carnage. A number of Congressional Republicans criticized her for using scarce wartime resources for her trip, prompting Franklin to suggest that she take a break from traveling.

Eleanor Roosevelt entertains soldiers as she tells a story, September 1943

Roosevelt supported increased roles for women and African-Americans in the war effort, and began to advocate for women to be given factory jobs a year before it became a widespread practice. In 1942, she urged women of all social backgrounds to learn trades, saying: "if I were of a debutante age I would go into a factory–any factory where I could learn a skill and be useful." Roosevelt learned of the high rate of absenteeism among working mothers, and she campaigned for government-sponsored day care. She supported the Tuskegee Airmen in their successful effort to become the first black combat pilots, visiting the Tuskegee Air Corps Advanced Flying School in Alabama. She also flew with African-American chief civilian instructor C. Alfred "Chief" Anderson. Anderson had been flying since 1929 and was responsible for training thousands of rookie pilots; he took her on a half-hour flight in a Piper J-3 Cub. After landing, she cheerfully announced, "Well, you can fly all right." The subsequent brouhaha over the first lady's flight had such an impact it is often mistakenly cited as the start of the Civilian Pilot Training Program at Tuskegee, even though the program was already five months old. Roosevelt did use her position as a trustee of the Julius Rosenwald Fund to arrange a loan of $175,000 to help finance the building of Moton Field.

During World War II, Roosevelt collaborated with the Office of the Coordinator of Inter-American Affairs to support President Roosevelt's Good Neighbor Policy in South America through the use of Cultural diplomacy. Her collaboration with Nelson Rockefeller, the R. H. Macy Co. and ambassadors from throughout South America led to the launch of Macy's Latin-American Exposition of 1942 as a showcase of South American culture for audiences throughout the United States..

After the war, Roosevelt was a strong proponent of the Morgenthau Plan to de-industrialize Germany in the postwar period. In 1947 she attended the National Conference on the German Problem in New York, which she had helped organize. It issued a statement that "any plans to resurrect the economic and political power of Germany" would be dangerous to international security.

== Years after the White House ==
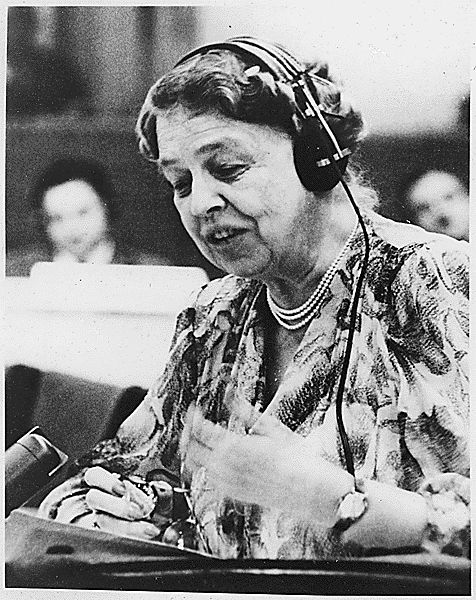
Roosevelt speaking at the United Nations in July 1947

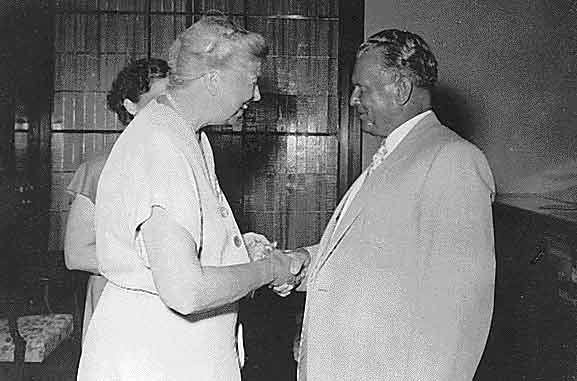
Roosevelt and leader Tito meet at Brijuni, Yugoslavia in 1953

Franklin died on April 12, 1945, after suffering a cerebral hemorrhage at the Little White House in Warm Springs, Georgia. Roosevelt later learned that her husband's mistress Lucy Mercer (now named Rutherfurd) had been with him when he died, a discovery made more bitter by learning that her daughter Anna had also been aware of the ongoing relationship between the President and Rutherfurd. It was Anna who told her that Franklin had been with Rutherfurd when he died; in addition, she told her that Franklin had continued the relationship for decades, and people surrounding him had hidden the information from his wife. After the funeral, Roosevelt temporarily returned to Val-Kill. Franklin left instructions for her in the event of his death; he proposed turning over Hyde Park to the federal government as a museum, and she spent the following months cataloging the estate and arranging for the transfer. After Franklin's death, she moved into an apartment at 29 Washington Square West in Greenwich Village. In 1950, she rented suites at the Park Sheraton Hotel (202 West 56th Street). She lived here until 1953 when she moved to 211 East 62nd Street. When that lease expired in 1958, she returned to the Park Sheraton as she waited for the house she purchased with Edna and David Gurewitsch at 55 East 74th Street to be renovated. She dedicated the Franklin D. Roosevelt Presidential Library and Museum on the Hyde Park estate to the nation on April 12, 1946, setting a precedent for future presidential libraries.

=== United Nations ===
State of the Union (Four Freedoms) (January 6, 1941)
Franklin Delano Roosevelt's January 6, 1941 State of the Union Address introducing the theme of the Four Freedoms (starting at 32:02)

In December 1945, President Harry S. Truman appointed Roosevelt as a delegate to the United Nations General Assembly. In April 1946, she became the first chairperson of the preliminary United Nations Commission on Human Rights. Roosevelt remained chairperson when the commission was established on a permanent basis in January 1947. Along with René Cassin, John Peters Humphrey and others, she played an instrumental role in drafting the Universal Declaration of Human Rights (UDHR).

In a speech on the night of September 28, 1948, Roosevelt spoke in favor of the Declaration, calling it "the international Magna Carta of all men everywhere". The Declaration was adopted by the General Assembly on December 10, 1948. The vote was unanimous, with eight abstentions: six Soviet Bloc countries as well as South Africa and Saudi Arabia. Roosevelt attributed the abstention of the Soviet bloc nations to Article 13, which provided the right of citizens to leave their countries.

Roosevelt also served as the first United States Representative to the United Nations Commission on Human Rights and stayed on at that position until 1953, even after stepping down as chair of the commission in 1951. The UN posthumously awarded her one of its first Human Rights Prizes in 1968 in recognition of her work.

In the 1940s, Roosevelt was among the first people to support the creation of a UN agency specialized in the issues of food and nutrition.

At that time, Frederick L. McDougall, an Australian nutritionist, wrote the "Draft memorandum on a United Nations Programme for Freedom from Want of Food". McDougall strongly believed that international cooperation was key to address the issue of hunger in the world.

Roosevelt learned about the memorandum and arranged a meeting between McDougall and her husband, the president of the United States of America. Following the discussion, the Food and Agriculture Organization of the United Nations (FAO) was created on October 16, 1945.

In 1955, Eleanor Roosevelt and McDougall visited the new FAO headquarters in Rome and pushed the United Nations Programme into creating the Food from Hunger campaign, which ultimately saw the light in 1960 after a series of negotiations.

The Campaign was created to mobilize non-governmental organizations against hunger and malnutrition in the world and help find solutions.

=== Other postwar activities and honors ===
In the late 1940s, Democrats in New York and throughout the country courted Roosevelt for political office.

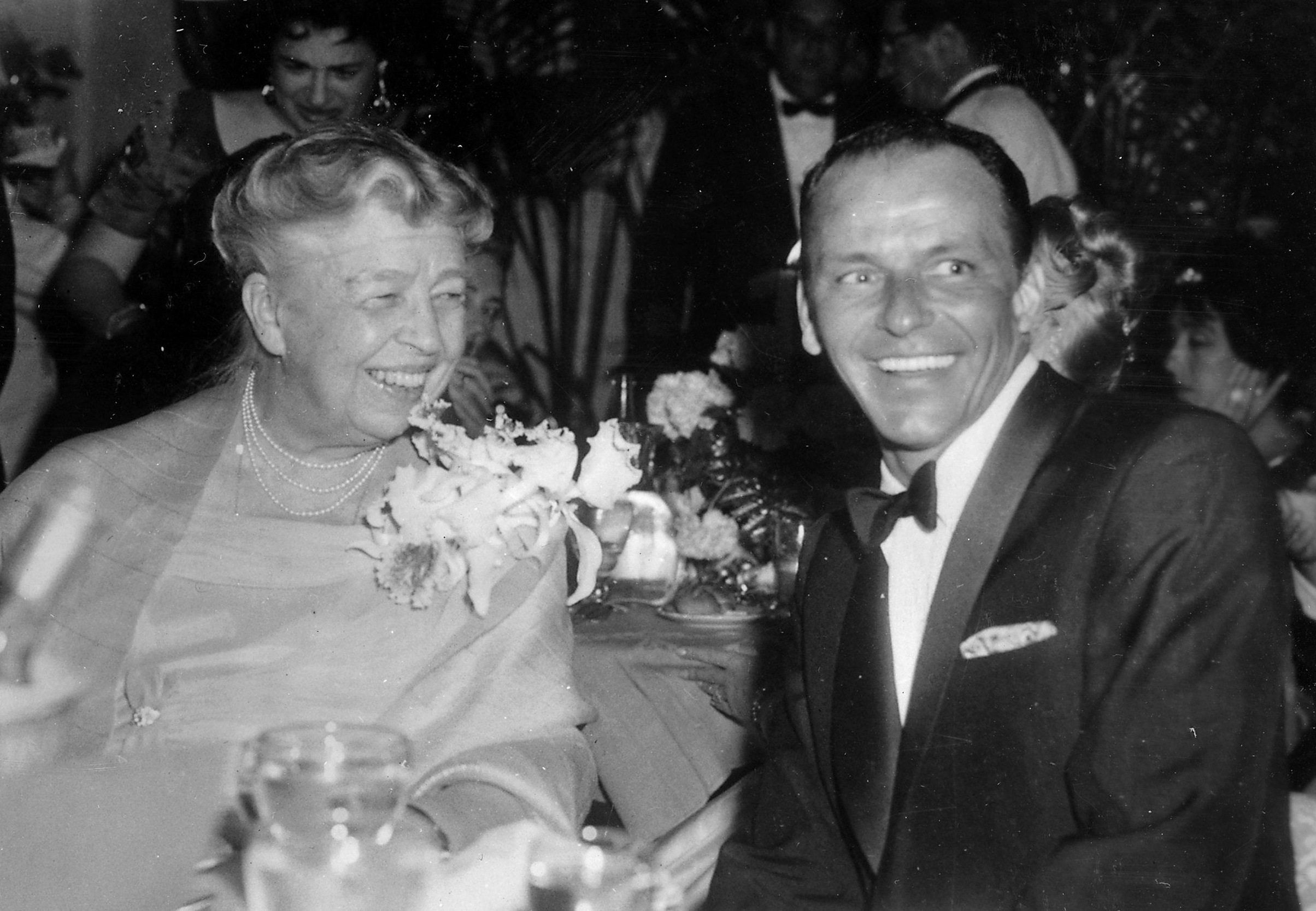
Roosevelt with Frank Sinatra in 1960

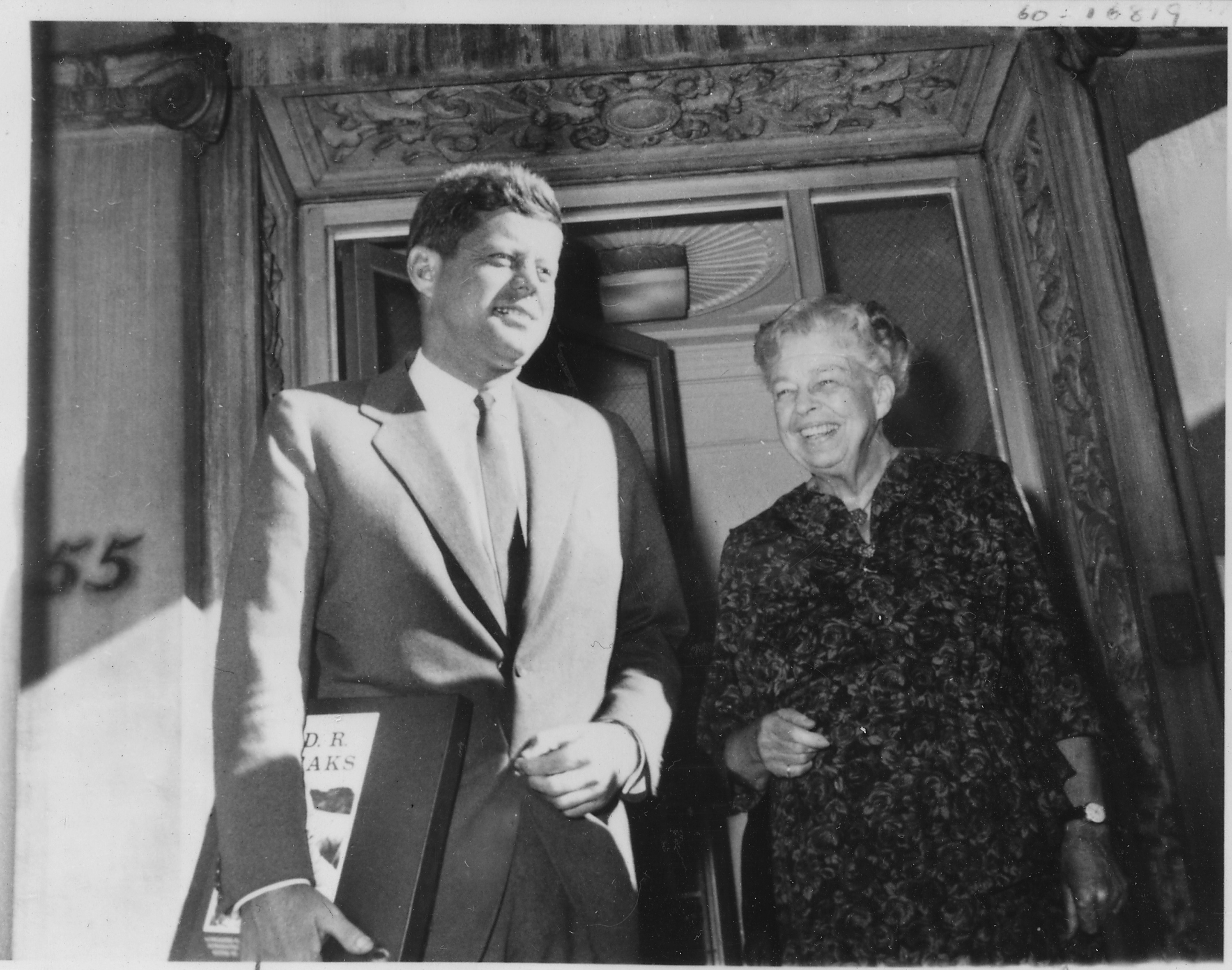
Despite her reservations, Roosevelt supported John F. Kennedy's campaign.

Catholics comprised a major element of the Democratic Party in New York City. Roosevelt supported reformers trying to overthrow the Irish machine Tammany Hall, and some Catholics called her anti-Catholic. In July 1949, Roosevelt had a bitter public disagreement with Cardinal Francis Spellman, the Archbishop of New York, over federal funding for parochial schools. Spellman said she was anti-Catholic, and supporters of both took sides in a battle that drew national attention and is "still remembered for its vehemence and hostility."

In 1949, she was made an honorary member of the historically black organization Alpha Kappa Alpha.

In 1950, she co-wrote, alongside Helen Ferris, editor in chief of the Junior Literary Guild, Partners: The United Nations and Youth, a look at the nascent organization's work with children of the world. It won the Child Study Association of America's Children's Book Award (now Bank Street Children's Book Committee's Josette Frank Award).

She was a supporter of the Encampment for Citizenship, a non-profit organization that conducts residential summer programs with year-round follow-up for young people of widely diverse backgrounds and nations. She routinely hosted encampment workshops at her Hyde Park estate, and when the program was attacked as "socialistic" by McCarthyite forces in the early 1950s, she vigorously defended it.

In 1954, Tammany Hall boss Carmine DeSapio led the effort to defeat Roosevelt's son, Franklin Delano Roosevelt Jr., in the election for New York Attorney General. Roosevelt grew increasingly disgusted with DeSapio's political conduct through the rest of the 1950s. Eventually, she would join with her old friends Herbert Lehman and Thomas Finletter to form the New York Committee for Democratic Voters, a group dedicated to opposing DeSapio's reincarnated Tammany Hall. Their efforts were eventually successful, and DeSapio was forced to relinquish power in 1961.

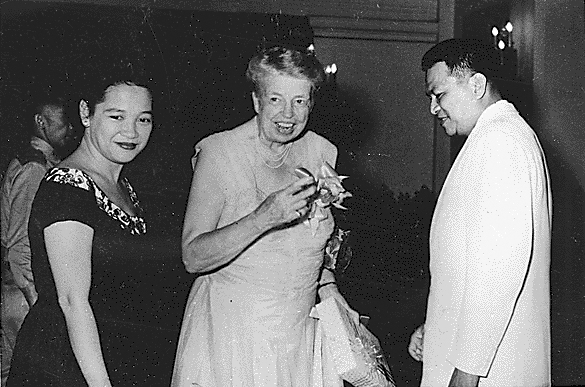
Roosevelt with President Ramon Magsaysay, the 7th President of the Philippines, and his wife at the Malacañan Palace in 1955

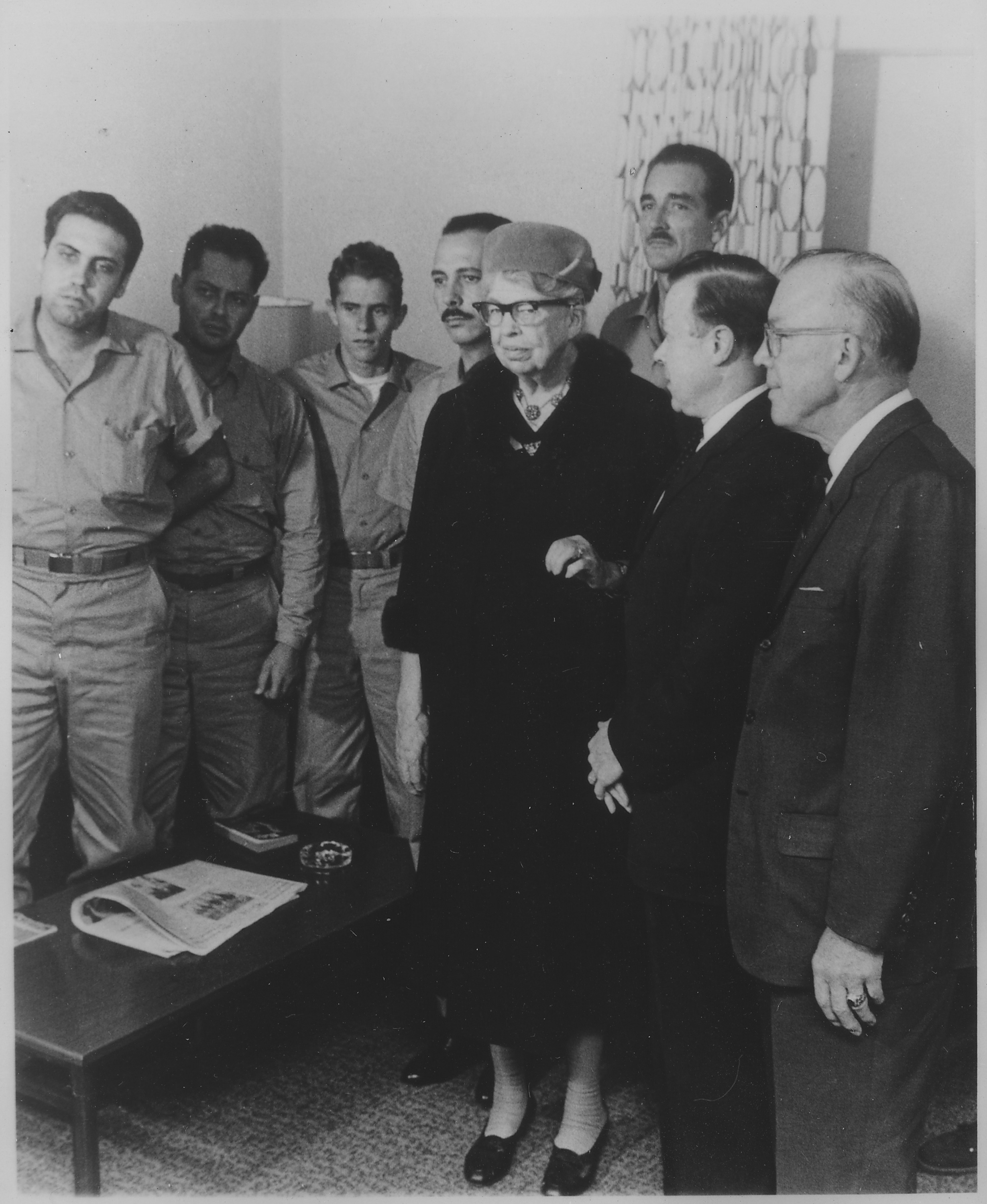
Eleanor Roosevelt, Walter Reuther, Milton Eisenhower and the Cuban prisoner exchange delegation in Washington, D.C., 1961

Roosevelt was disappointed when President Truman backed New York Governor W. Averell Harriman—a close associate of DeSapio—for the 1952 Democratic presidential nomination. She supported Adlai Stevenson for president in 1952 and 1956, and urged his renomination in 1960. She resigned from her UN post in 1953, when Dwight D. Eisenhower became president. She addressed the Democratic National Convention in 1952 and 1956. Although she had reservations about John F. Kennedy for his failure to condemn McCarthyism, she supported him for president against Richard Nixon. Kennedy later reappointed her to the United Nations, where she served again from 1961 to 1962, and to the National Advisory Committee of the Peace Corps.

By the 1950s, Roosevelt's international role as spokesperson for women led her to stop publicly criticizing the Equal Rights Amendment (ERA), although she never supported it. In the early 1960s, she announced that, due to unionization, she believed the ERA was no longer a threat to women as it once may have been and told supporters that they could have the amendment if they wanted it. In 1961, President Kennedy's undersecretary of labor, Esther Peterson, proposed a new Presidential Commission on the Status of Women. Kennedy appointed Roosevelt to chair the commission, with Peterson as director. This was Roosevelt's last public position. She died just before the commission issued its report. It concluded that female equality was best achieved by recognition of gender differences and needs, and not by an Equal Rights Amendment.

Throughout the 1950s, Roosevelt embarked on countless national and international speaking engagements. She continued to pen her newspaper column and made appearances on television and radio broadcasts. She averaged one hundred fifty lectures a year throughout the 1950s, many devoted to her activism on behalf of the United Nations. She was widely known for her anti-colonial stance. She supported Moroccan independence through both personal intervention with the US authorities and addressing the Moroccan question in her column My Day.

Roosevelt received the first annual Franklin Delano Roosevelt Brotherhood Award in 1946. Other awards she received during her life postwar included the Award of Merit of the New York City Federation of Women's Clubs in 1948, the Four Freedoms Award in 1950, the Irving Geist Foundation Award in 1950, and the Prince Carl Medal (from Sweden) in 1950. She was the most admired living woman, according to Gallup's most admired man and woman poll of Americans, every year between 1948 (the poll's inception) to 1961 (the last poll before her death) except 1951.

Following the Bay of Pigs in 1961, President Kennedy asked Roosevelt, labor leader Walter Reuther, and Milton S. Eisenhower, brother of President Eisenhower, to negotiate the release of captured Americans with Cuban leader Fidel Castro.

== Death ==
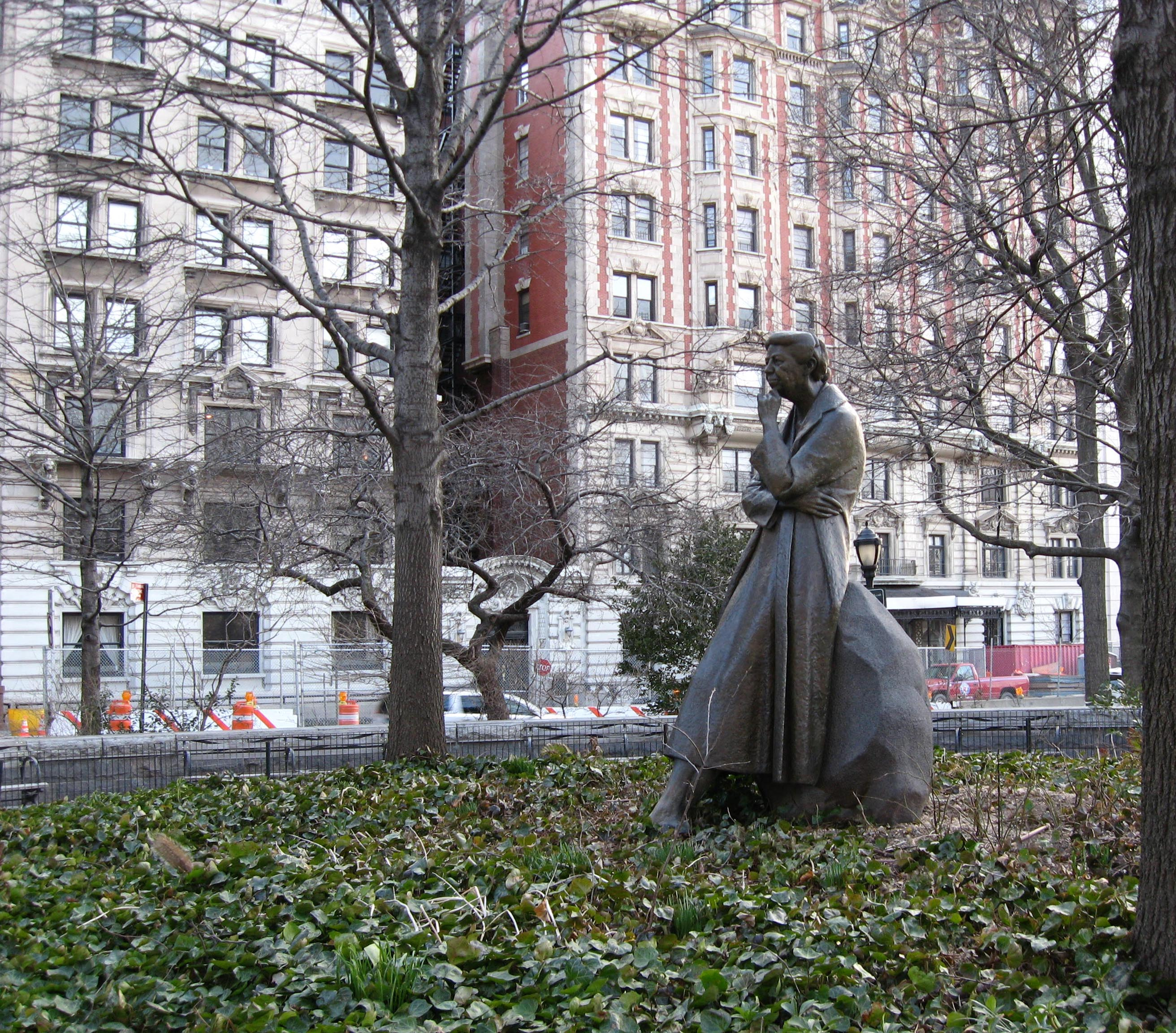
The Eleanor Roosevelt Monument in Riverside Park in Manhattan

In April 1960, Roosevelt was diagnosed with aplastic anemia soon after being struck by a car in New York City. In 1962, she was given steroids, which activated a dormant case of tuberculosis in her bone marrow, and she died at age 78 of resulting cardiac failure at her Manhattan home at 55 East 74th Street on the Upper East Side on November 7, 1962, cared for by her daughter, Anna. President John F. Kennedy ordered all United States flags lowered to half-staff throughout the world on November 8 in tribute to Roosevelt.

External videos
- Eleanor Roosevelt Dies (1962), 3:13, British Pathe

Funeral services were held two days later in Hyde Park, where she was interred next to her husband in the Rose Garden at Springwood Estate, the Roosevelt family home. Attendees included President Kennedy, Vice President Lyndon B. Johnson, and former presidents Truman and Eisenhower, who honored Roosevelt.

After her death, Roosevelt's retreat at Val-Kill near Hyde Park was eventually preserved as the Eleanor Roosevelt National Historic Site. Her family deeded the family vacation home on Campobello Island to the governments of the U.S. and Canada, and in 1964 they created the 2,800-acre (1,100 ha) Roosevelt Campobello International Park. The Franklin Delano Roosevelt Memorial on the National Mall is the only United States presidential memorial to depict a First Lady; the statue of Roosevelt is displayed with a likeness of the United Nations seal.

== Published books ==
- Hunting Big Game in the Eighties: The Letters of Elliott Roosevelt, Sportsman. New York: Scribners, 1932.
- When You Grow Up to Vote. Boston: Houghton Mifflin, 1932.
- It's Up to the Women. New York: Stokes, 1933.
- A Trip to Washington with Bobby and Betty. New York: Dodge, 1935.
- This Is My Story. New York: Harper, 1937.
- My Days. New York: Dodge, 1938.
- This Troubled World. New York: Kinsey, 1938.
- Christmas: A Story. New York: Knopf, 1940.
- Christmas, 1940. New York: St. Martin's. 1940.
- The Moral Basis of Democracy. New York: Howell, Soskin, 1940.
- This is America, a 1942 book with text by Eleanor Roosevelt and photographs by Frances Cooke Macgregor.
- If You Ask Me. New York: Appleton-Century, 1946.
- This I Remember. New York: Harper, 1949.
- Partners: The United Nations and Youth. Garden City: Doubleday, 1950 (with Helen Ferris).
- India and the Awakening East. New York: Harper, 1953.
- UN: Today and Tomorrow. New York: Harper, 1953 (with William DeWitt).
- It Seems to Me. New York: Norton, 1954.
- Ladies of Courage. New York: Putnam's, 1954 (with Lorena Hickok).
- United Nations: What You Should Know about It. New London: Croft, 1955.
- On My Own. New York: Harper, 1958.
- Growing Toward Peace. New York: Random House, 1960 (with Regina Tor).
- You Learn By Living. New York: Harper, 1960.
- The Autobiography of Eleanor Roosevelt. New York: Harper, 1961.
- Your Teens and Mine. New York: Da Capo, 1961.
- Eleanor Roosevelt's Book of Common Sense Etiquette. New York: Macmillan, 1962 (with the assistance of Robert O. Ballou).
- Eleanor Roosevelt's Christmas Book. New York: Dodd, Mead, 1963.
- Tomorrow Is Now. New York: Harper, 1963.

== Posthumous recognition ==
=== Recognition and awards ===
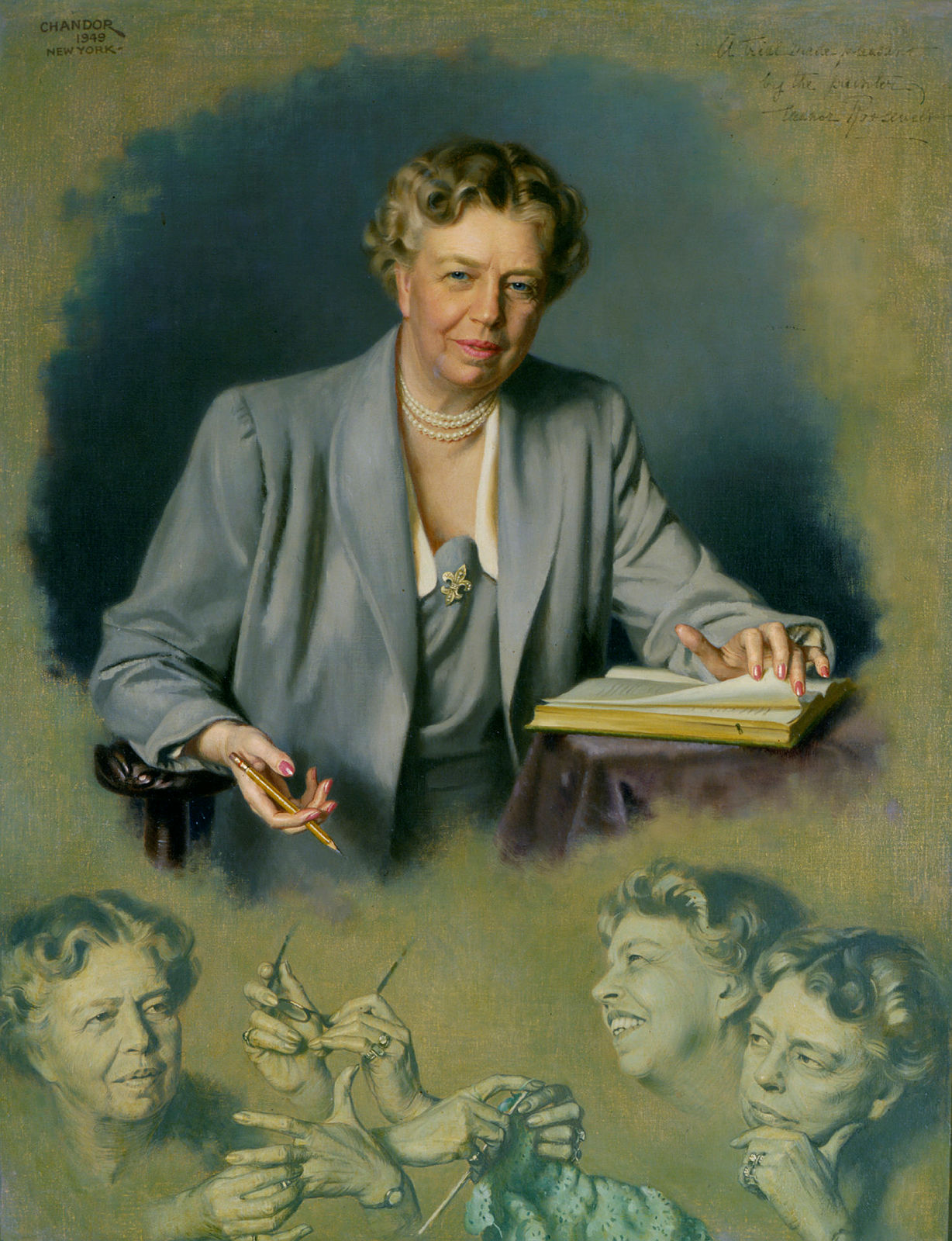
A 1949 portrait of Roosevelt by Douglas Chandor, purchased by the White House in 1966

In 1941, Freedom House was founded; Eleanor Roosevelt was its first honorary co-chair. Freedom House is a non-profit organization based in Washington, D.C., best known for political advocacy surrounding issues of democracy, political freedom, and human rights.

In 1946 she was made an honorary member of the Women's Press Club of London.

In 1966, the White House Historical Association purchased Douglas Chandor's portrait of Eleanor Roosevelt; the portrait had been commissioned by the Roosevelt family in 1949. The painting was presented at a White House reception on February 4, 1966, that was hosted by Lady Bird Johnson and attended by more than 250 invited guests. The portrait hangs in the Vermeil Room.

Roosevelt was posthumously inducted into the National Women's Hall of Fame in 1973.

The Eleanor Roosevelt Monument in New York's Riverside Park was dedicated in 1996, with First Lady Hillary Clinton serving as the keynote speaker. It was the first monument to an American woman in a New York City park. The centerpiece is a statue of Roosevelt sculpted by Penelope Jencks. The surrounding granite pavement contains inscriptions designed by the architect Michael Middleton Dwyer, including summaries of her achievements, and a quote from her 1958 speech at the United Nations advocating universal human rights.

In 1997, the Franklin Delano Roosevelt Memorial in Washington D.C. was dedicated; it includes a bronze statue of Eleanor Roosevelt standing before the United Nations emblem, which honors her dedication to the United Nations. It is the only presidential memorial to depict a first lady.

The Gallup Organization published the poll Gallup's List of Most Widely Admired People of the 20th Century, to determine which people around the world Americans most admired for what they did in the 20th century in 1999. Eleanor Roosevelt came in ninth.

In 2007, Eleanor Roosevelt was named a hero by The My Hero Project.

On April 20, 2016, United States Secretary of the Treasury Jacob Lew announced that Eleanor Roosevelt would appear with Marian Anderson and noted suffragettes on the redesigned US$5 bill scheduled to be unveiled in 2020, the 100th anniversary of the 19th Amendment of the U.S. Constitution, which guaranteed women the right to vote.

In 2020, Time magazine included Eleanor Roosevelt on its list of 100 Women of the Year. She was retroactively named Woman of the Year 1948 for her efforts on tackling issues surrounding human rights.

Roosevelt was honored on an American Women quarter in 2023.

=== Awards and organizations in her name ===
In 1989, the Eleanor Roosevelt Fund Award was founded by the American Association of University Women (AAUW); it "honors an individual, project, organization or institution for outstanding contributions to equality and education for women and girls." It has been on hiatus since 2011.

In 1998, President Bill Clinton established the Eleanor Roosevelt Award for Human Rights to honor outstanding American promoters of rights in the United States. The award was first awarded on the 50th anniversary of the Universal Declaration of Human Rights, honoring Eleanor Roosevelt's role as the "driving force" in the development of the UN's Universal Declaration of Human Rights. The award was originally presented from 1998 to the end of the Clinton Administration in 2001. In 2010, Secretary of State Hillary Clinton revived the Eleanor Roosevelt Award for Human Rights, and presented the award on behalf of the president, Barack Obama.

In 1999, actor Warren Beatty was awarded the Eleanor Roosevelt Award by the Americans for Democratic Action's Southern California chapter.

In 2001, the Eleanor Roosevelt Legacy Committee (Eleanor's Legacy) was founded by Judith Hollensworth Hope, who was its president until April 2008. It inspires and supports pro-choice Democratic women to run for local and state offices in New York. The Legacy sponsors campaign training schools, links candidates with volunteers and experts, collaborates with like-minded organizations and provides campaign grants to endorsed candidates.

In 2018, with the blessing of the Roosevelt family, the Eleanor Roosevelt Prize for Global Human Rights Advancement was established by the American Bar Association's Center for Human Rights. It is awarded annually.

=== Places named for Roosevelt ===
Eleanor Roosevelt School, also known as the Eleanor Roosevelt Vocational School for Colored Youth, Warm Springs Negro School, and the Eleanor Roosevelt Rosenwald School, which operated as a school from March 18, 1937, until 1972, was a historical Black community school located at 350 Parham Street at Leverette Hill Road in Warm Springs, Georgia. As of May 3, 2010, the school is listed on the National Register of Historic Places listings in Meriwether County, Georgia.

The town Norvelt was renamed as such in 1937 as a combination of the last syllables in Eleanor Roosevelt's names: EleaNOR RooseVELT. The Norvelt firefighter's hall is named Roosevelt Hall in her honor.

In 1972, the Eleanor Roosevelt Institute was founded; it merged with the Franklin D. Roosevelt Four Freedoms Foundation in 1987 to become the Roosevelt Institute. The Roosevelt Institute is a liberal American think tank. The organization, based in New York City, states that it exists "to carry forward the legacy and values of Franklin and Eleanor Roosevelt by developing progressive ideas and bold leadership in the service of restoring America's promise of opportunity for all."

Eleanor Roosevelt High School, a public magnet high school specializing in science, mathematics, technology, and engineering, was established in 1976 at its current location in Greenbelt, Maryland. It was the first high school named for Eleanor Roosevelt, and is part of the Prince George's County Public Schools system.

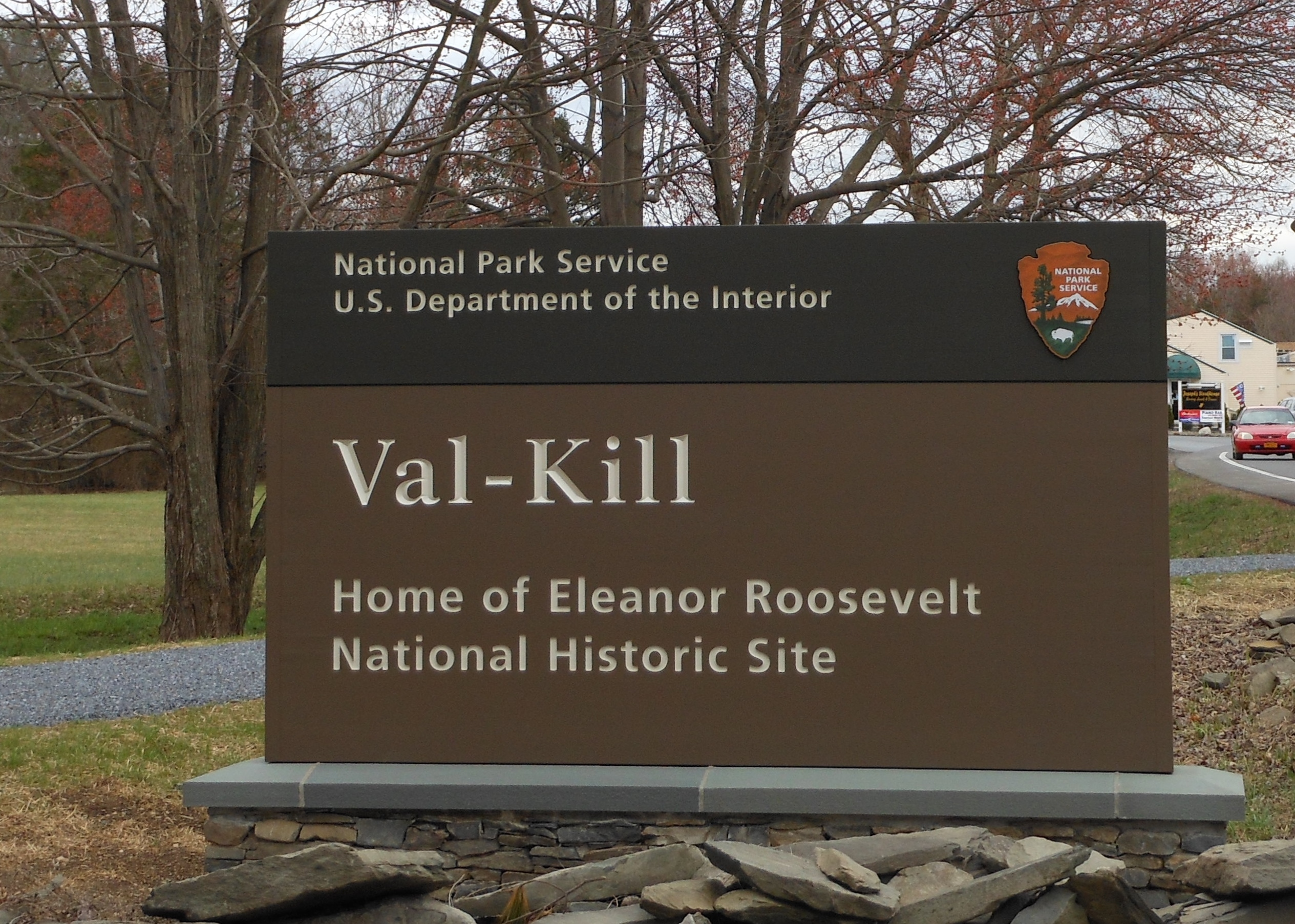
Val-Kill Historic Site, Hyde Park, New York

Roosevelt lived in a stone cottage at Val-Kill, which was two miles east of the Springwood Estate. The cottage had been her home after the death of her husband and was the only residence she had ever personally owned. In 1977, the home was formally designated by an act of Congress as the Eleanor Roosevelt National Historic Site, "to commemorate for the education, inspiration, and benefit of present and future generations the life and work of an outstanding woman in American history." In 1998, Save America's Treasures (SAT) announced Val-Kill cottage as a new official project. SAT's involvement led to the Honoring Eleanor Roosevelt (HER) project, initially run by private volunteers and now a part of SAT. The HER project has since raised almost $1 million, which has gone toward restoration and development efforts at Val-Kill and the production of Eleanor Roosevelt: Close to Home, a documentary about Roosevelt at Val-Kill. Due in part to the success of these programs, Val-Kill was given a $75,000 grant and named one of 12 sites showcased in Restore America: A Salute to Preservation, a partnership between SAT, the National Trust and HGTV. The Roosevelt Study Center, a research institute, conference center, and library on twentieth-century American history located in the twelfth-century Abbey of Middelburg, the Netherlands, opened in 1986. It is named after Eleanor Roosevelt, Theodore Roosevelt, and Franklin Roosevelt, all of whose ancestors emigrated from Zeeland, the Netherlands, to the United States in the seventeenth century.

In 1988, Eleanor Roosevelt College, one of eight undergraduate residential colleges at the University of California, San Diego, was founded. ERC emphasizes international understanding, including proficiency in a foreign language and a regional specialization. Eleanor Roosevelt High School, a small public high school on the Upper East Side of Manhattan in New York City, was founded in 2002. Eleanor Roosevelt High School in Eastvale, California, opened in 2006.

Eleanor Roosevelt Park, located northwest of the Warren Avenue/McClellan Circle intersection in the East Garrison neighborhood, an unincorporated area of Monterey County, California, is approximately 1.0-acre in size and contains a gazebo and concert lawn.

=== Historical assessments ===
Since 1982, the Siena College Research Institute has periodically conducted surveys asking historians to assess American first ladies according to a cumulative score on the independent criteria of their background, intelligence, value to the country, being their "own women", integrity, accomplishments, courage, leadership, public image, and value to the president. Roosevelt has been ranked by participating historians as the best-regarded first lady in each of the five such surveys to be conducted. In the 2003 survey, Roosevelt was ranked the highest in nine of the ten criteria (background, value to the country, intelligence, being her "own woman", integrity, accomplishments, courage, leadership, and value to the president). She was ranked the second-highest in the remaining category (public image) behind only Jacqueline Kennedy Onassis. In the 2008 survey, Roosevelt placed first in eight of the ten criteria (intelligence, courage, value to the country, being her "own woman", integrity, accomplishments, value to the president, and leadership) and second in the two remaining categories (background and public image) behind only Jacqueline Kennedy. In additional questions included in the 2014 survey, Roosevelt was assessed by historians as having been the greatest among 20th and 21st century first ladies in regards to advancing women's issues, being a political asset, being a strong public communicator, public service performed after leaving office, and creating a lasting legacy. She was also found to be the second-easiest first lady for historians to imagine serving as president herself. In the 2014 survey, Roosevelt and her husband were also ranked the highest among first couples in terms of being a "power couple".

== Cultural references and depictions ==
In the 1940s and 1950s, female impersonator Arthur Blake drew acclaim for his impersonations of Eleanor Roosevelt in his nightclub act. At the invitation of the Roosevelts, he performed his impersonation of Eleanor at the White House. He also impersonated Franklin in the 1952 film Diplomatic Courier.

The Eleanor Roosevelt Story, a 1965 American biographical documentary film directed by Richard Kaplan, won the Academy Award for Best Documentary Feature. The Academy Film Archive preserved it in 2006.

Roosevelt was the subject of the 1976 Arlene Stadd historical play Eleanor.

In 1979, NBC televised Backstairs at the White House based on the 1961 book, My Thirty Years Backstairs at the White House by Lillian Rogers Parks. The series portrayed the lives of the Presidents, their families, and the White House staff who served them from the administrations of William Howard Taft (1909–1913) through Dwight D. Eisenhower (1953–1961). Much of the book was based on notes by Parks's mother, Maggie Rogers, a White House maid. Parks credits Eleanor Roosevelt for encouraging her mother to start a diary about her service on the White House staff. The series won the Writers Guild of America award for Long Form Television Series, received a Golden Globe nomination for Dramatic Television Series, and won an Emmy for Outstanding Achievement in Makeup. Among the 10 additional Emmy nominations was Eileen Heckart. She received another Emmy nomination the following year in the NBC television film, F.D.R.: The Last Year.

In 1996, Washington Post writer Bob Woodward reported that Hillary Clinton had been having "imaginary discussions" with Eleanor Roosevelt from the start of Clinton's time as first lady. Following the Democrats' loss of congressional control in the 1994 elections, Clinton had engaged the services of Human Potential Movement proponent Jean Houston. Houston encouraged Clinton to pursue the Roosevelt connection, and while no psychic techniques were used with Clinton, critics and comics immediately suggested that Clinton was holding séances with Roosevelt. The White House stated that this was merely a brainstorming exercise, and a private poll later indicated that most of the public believed these were indeed just imaginary conversations, with the remainder believing that communication with the dead was actually possible. In her 2003 autobiography Living History, Clinton titled an entire chapter "Conversations with Eleanor", and stated that holding "imaginary conversations [is] actually a useful mental exercise to help analyze problems, provided you choose the right person to visualize. Eleanor Roosevelt was ideal."

In 1996, the children's picture book Eleanor by Barbara Cooney, about Eleanor Roosevelt, was published. It describes her as a shy girl who goes on to do great things.

FDR: American Badass! is a 2012 American comedy film spoofing the life and presidency of Franklin Roosevelt. In this version of his life, his polio is caused by werewolves. Werewolves are also behind the Axis powers, and it is up to President Roosevelt to stop them and their plans for world domination. The film features Lin Shaye as Eleanor Roosevelt.

In 2014, The Roosevelts was released. Produced and directed by Ken Burns, the series focuses on the lives of Theodore, Franklin, and Eleanor. The series premiered to positive reviews and was nominated for 3 Primetime Emmy Awards, with Peter Coyote winning for Outstanding Narrator for the first episode. In September 2014, The Roosevelts became the most streamed documentary on the PBS website to date.

Dear Eleanor is a 2016 film about two best friends traveling across the U.S. in 1962 to meet their childhood hero, Eleanor Roosevelt.

FDR is a 2023 miniseries that chronicles the life of Franklin D. Roosevelt and premiered on May 29, 2023, on History; in it Alice Bounsall plays Eleanor Roosevelt.

Susan Sarandon plays Roosevelt in the 2024 movie The Six Triple Eight.

== See also ==
- List of civil rights leaders
- List of peace activists
- List of women's rights activists

== Bibliography ==
- Cynthia Bemiss Abrams (February 5, 2025). "Original Media Influencer: Eleanor Roosevelt". Advanced TV Herstory (Podcast).
- Beasley, Maurine (December 1986). "Eleanor Roosevelt's Vision of Journalism: A Communications Medium for Women". Presidential Studies Quarterly. 16 (1): 66–75. JSTOR 27550311.
- Beasley, Maurine Hoffman; Shulman, Holly Cowan; Beasley, Henry R., eds. (December 30, 2000). The Eleanor Roosevelt Encyclopedia. Greenwood Publishing Group. ISBN 978-0313301810.
- Beasley, Maurine H. (October 21, 2010). Eleanor Roosevelt: Transformative First Lady. University Press of Kansas. ISBN 978-0700617272. 304 pages; biography that emphasizes how she used the media to pursue her activism.
- Beauchamp, Angela S. (2024). Eleanor Roosevelt on Screen: The First Lady's Appearances in Film and Television 1932-1962. McFarland & Company. ISBN 9781476693026.
- Cook, Blanche Wiesen (1992). Eleanor Roosevelt, Vol. 1: 1884–1933. Viking. ISBN 978-1101567463.
  - Cook, Blanche Wiesen (1999). Eleanor Roosevelt, Vol. 2: 1933–1938. Viking. ISBN 978-1101567456.
  - Cook, Blanche Wiesen. Eleanor Roosevelt: The War Years and After, 1939-1962. Volume 3 (2017)
- Cook, Blanche. The First Lady of Radio: Eleanor Roosevelt's Historic Broadcasts (New Press, 2014) online.
- de Kay, James Tertius (2012). Roosevelt's Navy. New York: Pegasus. pp. 9–10. ISBN 978-1-60598-285-4.
- Gerber, Robin (2003). Leadership the Eleanor Roosevelt Way. Penguin Random House. ISBN 978-0735203242.
- Glendon, M. A. (2000). "John P. Humphrey and the Drafting of the Universal Declaration of Human Rights". Journal of the History of International Law. 2 (2): 250–260. doi:10.1163/15718050020956858.
- Glendon, Mary Ann (2001). A World Made New: Eleanor Roosevelt and the Universal Declaration of Human Rights. Random House. ISBN 978-0375760464.
- Goodwin, Doris Kearns (1994). No Ordinary Time. Simon & Schuster. ISBN 978-0-684-80448-4.
- Lachman, Seymour P. (January 1, 1965). "The Cardinal, the Congressmen, and the First Lady". Journal of Church and State. 7 (1): 35–66. doi:10.1093/jcs/7.1.35.
- Lash, Joseph P. (1971). Eleanor and Franklin. New York City: W.W. Norton. ISBN 978-1-56852-075-9.
- Lash, Joseph P. (1972). Eleanor: The Years Alone. William S. Konecky. ISBN 978-1568520896.
- Michaelis, Davis. Eleanor (Simon & Schuster, 2020)ISBN 1439192057.
- O'Farrell, Brigid (2010). She Was One of Us: Eleanor Roosevelt and the American Worker. Cornell University Press. ISBN 978-0-8014-6246-7.304 pages
- Peyser, Mark; Dwyer, Timothy (2015). Hissing Cousins: The Untold Story of Eleanor Roosevelt and Alice Roosevelt Longworth. Doubleday. ISBN 978-0-385-53602-8.
- Pfeffer, Paula F. (September 1996). "Eleanor Roosevelt and the National and World Women's Parties". Historian. 59 (1): 39–58. doi:10.1111/j.1540-6563.1996.tb00983.x.
- Pottker, Jan (April 1, 2005). Sara and Eleanor: The Story of Sara Delano Roosevelt and Her Daughter-In-Law, Eleanor Roosevelt. Macmillan. ISBN 978-0-3123-3939-5. 416 pages
- Rowley, Hazel (2011). Franklin and Eleanor: An Extraordinary Marriage. Melbourne University Publishing. ISBN 9780522851793.
- Rowley, Hazel (2010). Franklin and Eleanor: An Extraordinary Marriage. Farrar, Straus and Giroux. ISBN 978-0-374-15857-6.
- Smith, Jean Edward (2007). FDR. Random House. ISBN 978-0-8129-7049-4.

== Historiography ==
- Provizer, Norman W. "Eleanor Roosevelt Biographies", in Pederson, William D. (2011). A Companion to Franklin D. Roosevelt. Blackwell Companions to American History. Wiley-Blackwell. pp. 15–33. ISBN 978-1-4443-9517-4.
- Beauchamp, Angela (Spring 2020). "I Will Not Be Your Little China Doll: Representations of Eleanor Roosevelt in Film and Television". Americana: The Journal of American Popular Culture. 19 (1).

Honorary titles
Preceded by Catherine Dunn	First Lady of New York; 1929–1932	Succeeded by Edith Altschul
Preceded by Lou Hoover	First Lady of the United States; 1933–1945	Succeeded by Bess Truman
Diplomatic posts
New office	Chair of the United Nations Commission on Human Rights; 1946–1952	Succeeded by Charles Malik
New office	United States Representative to the United Nations Commission on Human Rights; 1947–1953	Succeeded by Mary Lord
Government offices
New office	Chair of the Presidential Commission on the Status of Women; 1961–1962	Succeeded by Esther Peterson
