= Eleanor and Franklin =

Eleanor and Franklin may refer to:

- Eleanor and Franklin (book), 1971 biography by Joseph P. Lash
  - Eleanor: The Years Alone, 1972 companion volume to the previous biography
- Eleanor and Franklin (miniseries), 1976 television miniseries based on the biography
- Eleanor and Franklin: The White House Years, 1977 made-for-television film and sequel to the miniseries
