= Warm Springs (film) =

- Genre: Biography; Drama
- Written by: Margaret Nagle
- Directed by: Joseph Sargent
- Starring: Kenneth Branagh; Cynthia Nixon; David Paymer; Tim Blake Nelson; Jane Alexander; Kathy Bates
- Theme music composer: Bruce Broughton
- Country of origin: United States
- Original language: English

Production
- Producer: Chrisann Verges
- Cinematography: Robbie Greenberg
- Editor: Michael Brown
- Running time: 121 minutes
- Production companies: HBO Films; Mark Gordon Productions; The Mark Gordon Company

Original release
- Network: HBO
- Release: April 30, 2005

Warm Springs is a 2005 made-for-television biography drama film directed by Joseph Sargent, written by Margaret Nagle, and starring Kenneth Branagh, Cynthia Nixon, Kathy Bates, Tim Blake Nelson, Jane Alexander and David Paymer. The screenplay concerns U.S. President Franklin D. Roosevelt's 1921 illness, diagnosed at the time as polio, his struggle to overcome paralysis, his discovery of the Warm Springs resort, his work to turn it into a center for the rehabilitation of polio victims, and his resumption of his political career. Roosevelt's emotional growth as he interacts with other disabled people at Warm Springs prepares him for the challenges he will face as president during the Great Depression.

== Plot ==
The film opens in 1924 with a paralyzed Franklin D. Roosevelt living in semi-isolation on a Florida houseboat with two male attendants. He reminisces about running as vice president during the 1920 presidential election. Franklin, a Harvard-educated lawyer, New York assemblyman, and assistant Secretary of the Navy, gave a rousing speech, mentioning his cousin President Teddy Roosevelt's own run as vice president. Republican Warren Harding won the election, but Franklin's political rise had begun, though his opponents consider the arrogant Franklin a political lightweight.

When Franklin's wife, Eleanor discovers his extra-marital affair, they remained married but with mostly separate lives. Franklin was stricken with polio, leaving his lower body paralyzed. Devastated and refusing to be a burden, Franklin left for Florida to live on the houseboat.

When a storm wrecks the houseboat, Franklin and his attendants head to a nearby restaurant. Louis Howe, Franklin's political adviser, arrives and urges Franklin to return to New York and resume his political career. However. Franklin's old friend George Foster Peabody invites him stay at his resort, the Meriweather Inn, in Warm Springs, Georgia. Peabody claims a handicapped boy could walk while in the therapeutic mineral waters. Intrigued, Franklin heads to Warm Springs, along with Eleanor.

The Meriweather Inn is extremely rundown. Franklin rejects staying in a two-story residence, mostly fearing being trapped on the upper level in a fire. Resort manager Tom Loyless instead offers Frankline a one-story cottage. Once in the pool, Franklin is unable to stand, though Tom says he will in time. Meanwhile, Eleanor realizes Franklin intends to stay in Georgia.

Appalled by the dilapidated resort, Eleanor urges Franklin to return to New York City, saying it has the best doctors. He refuses, believing Warm Springs offers him a chance to walk again. Eleanor returns to New York where Louis launches her career as a social activist. Meanwhile, Franklin is eventually able to stand and move around in the buoyant waters. His celebrity results in an interview with the local newspaper. Franklin feels residents pity him, but Tom assures him they do not.

The resort closes for the season. When Franklin returns in the spring, he discovers that his newspaper interview was nationally syndicated and has attracted other polio victims to Warm Springs. Franklin angrily storms out; Tom chastises him, saying it is not Franklin's private resort and accuses him of having the same prejudices and pity that other people have towards polio victims.

At the train station, Franklin is about to return to New York. Tom is there to pick up Fred Botts, a newly arriving polio patient. Franklin is appalled that the young man was forced to ride in the baggage car alone and is barely conscious. Franklin berates the indifferent conductor. He and Tom take the man to the resort to recover. Tom informs Franklin that, due to the able-bodied guests fearing polio, he cannot use the pool during regular hours or eat in the dining room.

Soon after, physical therapist Helena Mahoney arrives to work at the resort, inspired by Franklin's interview. Helena says the waters are helping Franklin but he needs more pool time than is allowed. Franklin decides to buy the resort and turn it into a polio rehab center.

Franklin learns that Tom has terminal cancer and is returning home to die. Franklin's domineering mother, unable to understand Franklin's purpose at Warm Springs, sends Louis and Eleanor to stop him buying the resort and bring him back to New York. Upon arriving, Eleanor is supportive, and she and Franklin begin fund-raising. They accept a doctor's offer to evaluate hydrotherapy.

Louis believes Franklin is ready to resume his political career, aiming for Governor of New York. Meanwhile, Franklin receives the visiting doctor's unfavorable medical report in which he disputes hydrotherapy's benefits. With plans to turn the resort into a polio rehab center and regain his ability to walk possibly being derailed, Franklin becomes depressed. Helena, Louis, and Eleanor persuade him to revive his political career. They devise a method enabling Franklin to appear in public with a cane in his hand and supported by leg braces and minimal human assistance so he can be seen moving around in public without crutches and his wheelchair. The plan works and Franklin is elected Governor of New York.

The epilogue reveals that Franklin won the U.S. presidency four years later and became the only person elected to more than two terms, serving until his death while in office, at his Warm Springs cottage in 1945. The rehab center was Franklin's life insurance beneficiary and continues to operate to this day.

== Cast ==
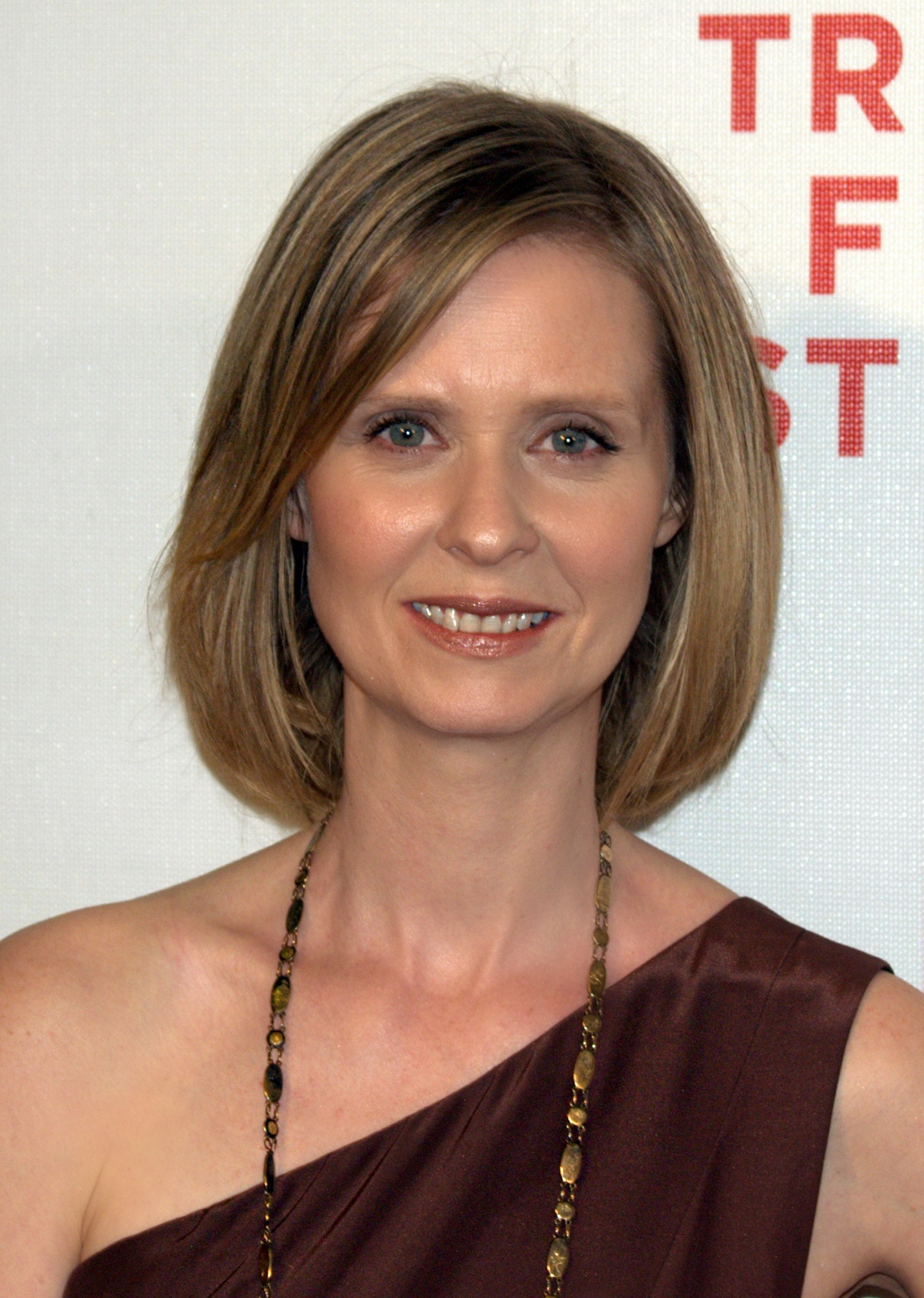
Sir Kenneth Branagh (pictured in 2026) and Cynthia Nixon (pictured in 2009) play Franklin and Eleanor Roosevelt respectively.

| Actor | Role |
|---|---|
| Kenneth Branagh | Franklin D. Roosevelt |
| Cynthia Nixon | Eleanor Roosevelt |
| Kathy Bates | Helena Mahoney |
| Tim Blake Nelson | Tom Loyless |
| Jane Alexander | Sara Delano Roosevelt |
| David Paymer | Louis McHenry Howe |
| Melissa Ponzio | Lucy Mercer |
| Marianne Fraulo | Missy LeHand |
| Brian F. Durkin | Elliott Roosevelt |
| Turner Dixon | James Roosevelt |
| Tripp Hennington | Franklin D. Roosevelt Jr. |
| Sam Frihart | John Roosevelt |
| Carrie Adams | Anna Roosevelt |
| Wilbur Fitzgerald | Al Smith |
| Felicia Day | Eloise Hutchinson |

== Production ==
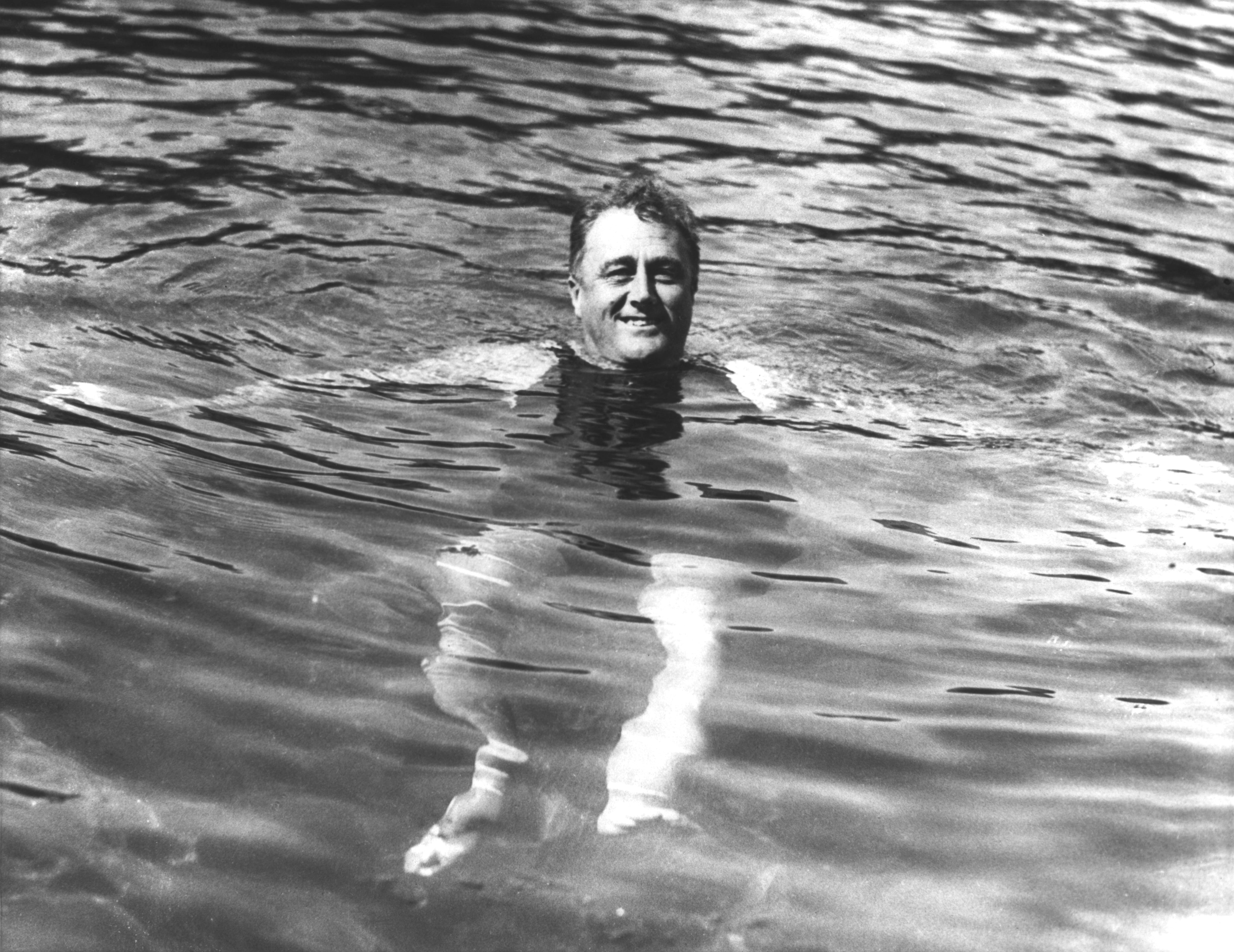
Franklin D. Roosevelt swimming in a pool at Warm Springs in 1929.

The film was produced by HBO Films and directed by Joseph Sargent. The majority of the film was made at Warm Springs, Georgia and its surrounding locations. Other Georgia locations include Madison, Atlanta, Summerville, and Gainesville.

The producers strove to make sure that many of the physical details were as authentic as possible. For example, Kenneth Branagh, as Franklin D. Roosevelt, is seen driving the very same specially-equipped automobile that Roosevelt was taught to drive at Warm Springs. The cottage that Roosevelt stays in during the film is one of the cottages that the real Roosevelt stayed in. And the swimming pool in which the patients swim in is the actual therapeutic swimming pool at Warm Springs, refurbished specifically for the film.

Actress Jane Alexander, who plays Roosevelt's mother Sara Delano Roosevelt, also played Eleanor Roosevelt in the acclaimed 1976 telefilm Eleanor and Franklin and its 1977 sequel Eleanor and Franklin: The White House Years. Many of the bit part actors in the film are actually physically disabled, though Branagh and several other of the principal actors are not. The withered appearance of Branagh's legs was achieved through the use of CGI.

== Reception ==
Tom Jicha of the South Florida Sun-Sentinel found the film "more educational than entertaining", but said "Kenneth Branagh offers an exemplary turn". Rob Owens of the Pittsburgh Post-Gazette said, "Warm Springs isn't a revolutionary or ground-breaking film, but it is a solid depiction of a time in the life of a figure who loomed large in 20th century American history." Sid Smith of the Chicago Tribune said that Branagh and Cynthia Nixon "play these familiar icons as real, flesh-and-blood people", and also noted memorable work by David Paymer, Kathy Bates and Tim Blake Nelson. Kevin McDonough of United Feature Syndicate called the film "intimate and powerful".

Hal Boedeker of the Orlando Sentinel takes some issue with some of the writing, but says the film is "impressive" and that "Tim Blake Nelson is heart-rending as the spa's proprietor." He also noted that before Roosevelt died at Warm Springs, he listed the rehabilitation center as beneficiary of his $562,000 life insurance policy.

== Accolades ==
| Year | Award | Category | Nominee(s) | Result | Ref. |
|---|---|---|---|---|---|
| 2005 | Artios Awards | Outstanding Achievement in Movie of the Week Casting | Lynn Kressel | Nominated | |
| 2005 | International Film Music Critics Association Awards | Best Original Score for Television | Bruce Broughton | Nominated | |
| 2005 | Online Film & Television Association Awards | Best Motion Picture Made for Television | | Won | |
| 2005 | Online Film & Television Association Awards | Best Actor in a Motion Picture or Miniseries | Kenneth Branagh | Won | |
| 2005 | Online Film & Television Association Awards | Best Actress in a Motion Picture or Miniseries | Cynthia Nixon | Nominated | |
| 2005 | Online Film & Television Association Awards | Best Supporting Actress in a Motion Picture or Miniseries | Jane Alexander | Nominated | |
| 2005 | Online Film & Television Association Awards | Best Supporting Actress in a Motion Picture or Miniseries | Kathy Bates | Nominated | |
| 2005 | Online Film & Television Association Awards | Best Direction of a Motion Picture or Miniseries | Joseph Sargent | Nominated | |
| 2005 | Online Film & Television Association Awards | Best Writing of a Motion Picture or Miniseries | Margaret Nagle | Won | |
| 2005 | Online Film & Television Association Awards | Best Ensemble in a Motion Picture or Miniseries | | Nominated | |
| 2005 | Online Film & Television Association Awards | Best Lighting in a Motion Picture or Miniseries | | Nominated | |
| 2005 | Online Film & Television Association Awards | Best Makeup/Hairstyling in a Motion Picture or Miniseries | | Nominated | |
| 2005 | Online Film & Television Association Awards | Best Music in a Motion Picture or Miniseries | Bruce Broughton | Nominated | |
| 2005 | Primetime Emmy Awards | Outstanding Made for Television Movie | Mark Gordon, Celia D. Costas, and Chrisann Verges | Won | |
| 2005 | Primetime Emmy Awards | Outstanding Lead Actor in a Miniseries or a Movie | Kenneth Branagh | Nominated | |
| 2005 | Primetime Emmy Awards | Outstanding Lead Actress in a Miniseries or a Movie | Cynthia Nixon | Nominated | |
| 2005 | Primetime Emmy Awards | Outstanding Supporting Actress in a Miniseries or a Movie | Jane Alexander | Won | |
| 2005 | Primetime Emmy Awards | Outstanding Supporting Actress in a Miniseries or a Movie | Kathy Bates | Nominated | |
| 2005 | Primetime Emmy Awards | Outstanding Directing for a Miniseries, Movie or a Dramatic Special | Joseph Sargent | Nominated | |
| 2005 | Primetime Emmy Awards | Outstanding Writing for a Miniseries, Movie or a Dramatic Special | Margaret Nagle | Nominated | |
| 2005 | Primetime Emmy Awards | Outstanding Art Direction for a Miniseries or Movie | Sarah Knowles, Scott Ritenour, Thomas Minton, and Frank Galline | Won (Note: Tied with John Paul Kelly, Emma MacDevitt, and Sara Wan for The Lost Prince.) | |
| 2005 | Primetime Emmy Awards | Outstanding Casting for a Miniseries, Movie or Special | Lynn Kressel and Shay Bentley-Griffin | Nominated | |
| 2005 | Primetime Emmy Awards | Outstanding Cinematography for a Miniseries or Movie | Robbie Greenberg | Nominated | |
| 2005 | Primetime Emmy Awards | Outstanding Costumes for a Miniseries, Movie or a Special | Hope Hanafin and Keith G. Lewis | Nominated | |
| 2005 | Primetime Emmy Awards | Outstanding Hairstyling for a Miniseries, Movie or a Special | Taylor Knight and Vanessa Davis | Nominated | |
| 2005 | Primetime Emmy Awards | Outstanding Makeup for a Miniseries, Movie or a Special (Non-Prosthetic) | Carla White and Donna M. Premick | Nominated | |
| 2005 | Primetime Emmy Awards | Outstanding Music Composition for a Miniseries, Movie or a Special (Original Dramatic Score) | Bruce Broughton | Won | |
| 2005 | Primetime Emmy Awards | Outstanding Sound Editing for a Miniseries, Movie or a Special | Richard Taylor, David Beadle, Jane Boegel, Russell DeWolf, Andrew Ellerd, Juanita F. Diana, Sonya Henry, Patrick Hogan, Eileen Horta, Jason Lezama, Stuart Martin, Todd Murakami, Brian Thomas Nist, Robert Ramirez, Mark Cookson, Ed Kalnins, James Bailey, and John Benson | Nominated | |
| 2005 | Primetime Emmy Awards | Outstanding Single-Camera Sound Mixing for a Miniseries or a Movie | Mary H. Ellis, Rick Ash, and Adam Jenkins | Won | |
| 2005 | Satellite Awards | Best Motion Picture Made for Television | | Nominated | |
| 2005 | Satellite Awards | Best Actor in a Miniseries or Motion Picture Made for Television | Kenneth Branagh | Nominated | |
| 2005 | Satellite Awards | Best Actress in a Miniseries or Motion Picture Made for Television | Cynthia Nixon | Nominated | |
| 2005 | Satellite Awards | Best Actor in a Supporting Role in a Series, Miniseries or Motion Picture Made for Television | Tim Blake Nelson | Nominated | |
| 2005 | Satellite Awards | Best Actress in a Supporting Role in a Series, Miniseries or Motion Picture Made for Television | Jane Alexander | Nominated | |
| 2006 | AARP Movies for Grownups Awards | Best TV Movie | | Nominated | |
| 2006 | American Cinema Editors Awards | Best Edited Miniseries or Motion Picture for Non-Commercial Television | Michael Brown | Nominated | |
| 2006 | American Society of Cinematographers Awards | Outstanding Achievement in Cinematography in Movies of the Week/Mini-Series/Pilot | Robbie Greenberg | Won | |
| 2006 | Art Directors Guild Awards | Excellence in Production Design Award – Television Movie or Mini-series | Sarah Knowles, Scott Ritenour, and Thomas Minton | Nominated | |
| 2006 | Costume Designers Guild Awards | Outstanding Made for Television Movie or Miniseries | Hope Hanafin | Nominated | |
| 2006 | Critics' Choice Awards | Best Picture Made for Television | | Nominated | |
| 2006 | Directors Guild of America Awards | Outstanding Directorial Achievement in Movies for Television or Miniseries | Joseph Sargent | Won (Note: Tied with George C. Wolfe for Lackawanna Blues.) | |
| 2006 | Golden Globe Awards | Best Miniseries or Television Film | | Nominated | |
| 2006 | Golden Globe Awards | Best Actor – Miniseries or Television Film | Kenneth Branagh | Nominated | |
| 2006 | Golden Globe Awards | Best Actress – Miniseries or Television Film | Cynthia Nixon | Nominated | |
| 2006 | Humanitas Prize | 90 Minute or Longer Network or Syndicated Television | Margaret Nagle | Nominated | |
| 2006 | Producers Guild of America Awards | David L. Wolper Award for Outstanding Producer of Long-Form Television | Mark Gordon, Celia D. Costas, and Chrisann Verges | Nominated | |
| 2006 | Screen Actors Guild Awards | Outstanding Performance by a Male Actor in a Miniseries or Television Movie | Kenneth Branagh | Nominated | |
| 2006 | Screen Actors Guild Awards | Outstanding Performance by a Female Actor in a Miniseries or Television Movie | Cynthia Nixon | Nominated | |
| 2006 | Visual Effects Society Awards | Outstanding Supporting Visual Effects in a Broadcast Program | Camille Cellucci, Jonathan Keeton, Kirk Cadrette, and John Baker | Nominated | |
| 2006 | Writers Guild of America Awards | Long Form – Original | Margaret Nagle | Won | |

== See also ==
- Franklin D. Roosevelt's paralytic illness
- Warm Springs Historic District
- Sunrise at Campobello, 1958 play
- Sunrise at Campobello, 1960 film
