= Keysville =

Keysville may refer to a location in the United States:

- Keysville, California, former name of Keyesville, California
- Keysville, Florida
- Keysville, Georgia
- Keysville, Missouri
- Keysville, Maryland
- Keysville, Virginia

== See also ==
- Keysville Mission Industrial Academy former school in Keysville, Virginia, US
- Keysville Railroad Station
