= Walter McGinn =

American actor

- Born: Walter Vincent McGinn Jr. July 6, 1936; Providence, Rhode Island, U.S.
- Died: March 31, 1977 (aged 40); Los Angeles, California, U.S.
- Education: Boston University College of Fine Arts
- Occupation: Actor
- Years active: 1963–1977
- Spouse: Robyn Goodman (m. 1976; died 1977)

Walter Vincent McGinn Jr. (July 6, 1936 – March 31, 1977) was an American actor. He was best known for playing Louis Howe in the critically acclaimed television film Eleanor and Franklin: The White House Years (1977), for which he posthumously received a Primetime Emmy Award nomination. Some of his other notable film roles were in The Parallax View (1974), Three Days of the Condor (1975) and Bobby Deerfield (1977).

== Early life and career ==
Born Walter Vincent McGinn Jr. in Providence, Rhode Island, on July 6, 1936. He graduated with a B.A. from the Boston University College of Fine Arts. He was married to Robyn Goodman on May 2, 1976, until his death.

McGinn made his Off-Broadway debut in the 1963 production of the play The Winter's Tale at the Delacorte Theater and Broadway debut in the 1964 play The Subject Was Roses at the Helen Hayes Theater. He later appeared on both stage and screen.

== Death ==
McGinn died in a Los Angeles hospital from injuries sustained in an auto accident on March 31, 1977. He was 40 years old.

== Filmography ==
=== Film ===
Year	Title	Role
1974	The Parallax View	Jack Younger
1975	Farewell, My Lovely	Tommy Ray
1975	Three Days of the Condor	Sam Barber
1977	Bobby Deerfield	The Brother

=== Television ===
Year	Title	Role	Notes
1969	N.Y.P.D.	Nick Gipetto	Episode: "Everybody Loved Him"
1974	Harry O	Eric Press	Episode: "Mortal Sin"
1974	Kojak	Martin Bronson	Episode: "The Best Judge Money Can Buy"
1975	Lincoln	Stephen Douglas	Episode: "Prairie Lawyer"
1975	Delancey Street: The Crisis Within	John McCann	Television film
1975	The Night That Panicked America	Paul Stewart	Television film
1975	Guilty or Innocent: The Sam Sheppard Murder Case	F. Lee Bailey	Television film
1975	Medical Center	Eddie Lathem	Episode: "Gift from a Killer"
1976	Serpico	David Doyle	Episode: "The Deadly Game"
1976	Kojak	Len Gittings	Episode: "A Hair-Trigger Away"
1976	Serpico	Vince Cipolla	Episode: "Trumpet of Time"
1977	Eleanor and Franklin: The White House Years	Louis Howe	Television film
1977	The Deadliest Season	Horace Meade	Television film
1977	Kill Me If You Can	J. Miller Leavy	Television film

== Awards and nominations ==
Year	Award	Category	Work	Result
1972	17th Drama Desk Awards	Outstanding Performance	That Championship Season	Won
1977	29th Primetime Emmy Awards	Outstanding Performance by a Supporting Actor in a Comedy or Drama Special	Eleanor and Franklin: The White House Years	Nominated
