= Eleanor and Franklin (miniseries) =

1976 American television miniseries

- VHS cover
- Genre: Biography; Drama; Romance
- Based on: Eleanor and Franklin by Joseph P. Lash
- Written by: James Costigan
- Directed by: Daniel Petrie
- Starring: Edward Herrmann; Jane Alexander
- Theme music composer: John Barry
- Country of origin: United States

Production
- Executive producer: David Susskind
- Producers: Audrey Maas; Harry R. Sherman
- Editor: Michael Kahn
- Running time: 240 minutes
- Production company: Talent Associates

Original release
- Network: ABC
- Release: January 11 – January 12, 1976

Related
- Eleanor and Franklin: The White House Years (1977)

Eleanor and Franklin is a 1976 American television miniseries starring Edward Herrmann as Franklin D. Roosevelt (FDR) and Jane Alexander as Eleanor Roosevelt which was broadcast on ABC on January 11 and 12, 1976. It is the first part in a two-part "biopic" miniseries (with a later sequel telecast the following year) based on Joseph P. Lash's biography and history from 1971, Eleanor and Franklin, based on their correspondence and recently opened archives. Joseph Lash was Eleanor's personal secretary and confidant. He wrote several books on the Roosevelts including some on both Eleanor and Franklin individually and was also a controversial activist in his own right in leftist, liberalism, social and labor issues of the era.

Directed by Daniel Petrie, the film follows Franklin and Eleanor's lives told in flashback from her perspective after her husband's death, from the time they were children as cousins who met briefly, their courtship and marriage, bearing and raising a large family, her social efforts as he rises to Assistant Secretary of the Navy in World War I, the hidden affair with Lucy Mercer, (1891–1948), (portrayed for the first time by actress Linda Kelsey), her help and encouragement with his 1921 paralytic illness, and her campaigning with Louis Howe, (1871–1936), their mentor, crony and campaign manager during his runs for political offices in the New York state legislature, the unsuccessful effort for Vice President in 1920, later winning as Governor of New York and his rivalry with fellow politician Al Smith, (1873–1944), until his election to the Presidency in 1932 in the darkest times faced by the nation since the Civil War with the deepening "Great Depression".

A second film miniseries, Eleanor and Franklin: The White House Years (1977), was made the following year which detailed Roosevelt's terms as president during the Great Depression and World War II, told as a series of flashback episodes as Eleanor sits with her husband's body in the back bedroom during a legendary private moment in the cottage, the "Little White House" in Warm Springs, Georgia, on April 12, 1945.

The film won numerous awards, including 11 Primetime Emmy Awards (Outstanding Television Movie and Outstanding Supporting Actress in a Television Movie for Rosemary Murphy), the Golden Globe Award for Best TV Movie, and the Peabody Award. The director Daniel Petrie won for Director of the Year – Special, as he would again the next year with "The White House Years". The film is noted for being almost entirely historically accurate.

== Cast ==
- Edward Herrmann — Franklin D. Roosevelt (FDR)
- Jane Alexander — Eleanor Roosevelt
- Rosemary Murphy — Sara Delano Roosevelt, FDR's mother
- Pamela Franklin — Anna Hall Roosevelt, Eleanor's mother
- David Huffman — Elliott Roosevelt I, Eleanor's father
- Irene Tedrow — Mary Ludlow Hall, Eleanor's grandmother who raised her
- John Burnett — Hall Roosevelt, Eleanor's brother and nephew to Theodore Roosevelt
- Linda Kelsey — Lucy Mercer, FDR's mistress
- William Phipps — Theodore Roosevelt, Uncle to Eleanor, 5th cousin once removed of FDR and 26th President of the United States
- Linda Purl — Alice Roosevelt Longworth, daughter of Teddy, Eleanor's 1st cousin
- Devon Ericson — Corinne Robinson, Teddy's niece and 1st cousin to Eleanor and Alice
- Teresa Steenhoek — Anna Roosevelt Halsted, FDR's daughter
- Lilia Skala — Marie Souvestre, Teacher, mentor, close friend of Eleanor's from Allenswood Boarding Academy
- Ed Flanders — Louis Howe, intimate friend and political advisor to FDR and Eleanor
- Arthur Adams — Arthur Prettyman, FDR's personal valet
- Helen Kleeb — Margaret Daisy Suckley, neighbor, friend, 6th cousin of FDR
- Peggy McCay — Grace Tully, private secretary of FDR
- Anna Lee — Laura Delano, FDR's cousin at the Little White House when he passed
- Harry Holcombe — Steve Early, political advisor to FDR and future White House Press Secretary
- Ned Wilson — Endicott Peabody, FDR's headmaster at Groton's School for Boys and officiated his wedding
- Len Wayland — Admiral Ross McIntire, FDR's personal doctor
- Lindsay Crouse — Marjorie Bennett, Eleanor's roommate at Allenswood
- Edward Winter — Joe McCall, reporter on funeral train with Eleanor
- Mackenzie Phillips — Eleanor, age 14

== DVD ==
Eleanor and Franklin was released on DVD by HBO Video in 2005 as a single disc feature, and in 2013 as a two-disc set with Eleanor and Franklin: The White House Years featured on the second disc.

== See also ==
- Keysville Railroad Station
- Dinwiddie County Pullman Car
