= Eleanor and Franklin: The White House Years =

- DVD cover
- Genre: Biography; Drama
- Based on: Eleanor and Franklin by Joseph P. Lash
- Written by: James Costigan
- Directed by: Daniel Petrie
- Starring: Jane Alexander; Edward Herrmann; Priscilla Pointer; Walter McGinn
- Music by: John Barry
- Country of origin: United States
- Original language: English

Production
- Producers: Harry R. Sherman; David Susskind
- Cinematography: James Crabe
- Editors: Michael S. McLean; Rita Roland
- Running time: 180 minutes
- Production company: Talent Associates

Original release
- Network: ABC
- Release: March 13, 1977

Eleanor and Franklin: The White House Years is a 1977 American television film and a sequel to Eleanor and Franklin (1976). Originally airing on March 13, 1977, it was part of a 2-part biographical film directed by Daniel Petrie based on Joseph P. Lash's Pulitzer Prize-winning biography, Eleanor and Franklin, chronicling the lives of the 32nd U.S. President and the first lady. Joseph Lash was a secretary and confidant of Eleanor and wrote other books on the couple.

Eleanor and Franklin focused on their respective childhoods, school years, courtship and the lead-up to his election. 7 of the original cast returned for the sequel, including lead actors, Jane Alexander and Edward Herrmann. It won 7 Primetime Emmy Awards, including Outstanding Special of the Year. Daniel Petrie won Director of the Year – Special again. Both films were acclaimed and noted for historical accuracy.

== Cast ==
- Edward Herrmann – Franklin D. Roosevelt (FDR), 32nd President of the United States
- Jane Alexander – Eleanor Roosevelt, 34th First Lady of the United States
- Priscilla Pointer – Marguerite Missy LeHand. Long-time secretary to Franklin and considered part of the family.
- Walter McGinn – Louis Howe, intimate friend to both Roosevelts and political advisor to Franklin
- Rosemary Murphy – Sara Delano Roosevelt, Franklin's mother
- Blair Brown – Anna Roosevelt, Eleanor and Franklin's eldest child
- David Healy – Theodore Roosevelt, 26th President of the United States, uncle to Eleanor and 5th cousin to Franklin
- Peggy McCay – Grace Tully, long-time friend/secretary to Eleanor and became Franklin's top secretary after Missy died.
- Donald Moffat – Harry Hopkins, one of Franklin's closest advisers and architect of the New Deal. He was an important liaison between FDR, Winston Churchill, and Stalin meeting personally with the leaders and setting up negotiations during World War II.
- Toni Darnay – Malvina Thompson, Eleanor's personal secretary
- Barbara Conrad (Barbara Smith Conrad) – Marian Anderson, an American contralto singer. The Daughters of the American Revolution refused to allow her to perform before an integrated audience in their Constitution Hall, spurring First Lady Eleanor Roosevelt to resign from the organization and to aid in arranging for Anderson to sing from the steps of the Lincoln Memorial. Anderson went on to sing at the inaugurations of Presidents Dwight D. Eisenhower and John F. Kennedy.
- Morgan Farley – William Plog, managed the Roosevelts' Hyde Park estate
- Mark Harmon – Robert Dunlap, a soldier
- Anna Lee – Laura Delano, FDR's cousin
- Linda Kelsey – Lucy Mercer, mistress of FDR
- Colin Hamilton – Ike Hoover, Chief Usher of the White House; served both Roosevelt presidents
- Ray Baker – James Roosevelt, oldest son of the Roosevelts who served as a secretary in his father's White House and went on to become a U.S. Marine serving in World War II. He later became a Congressman from California for 10 years.
- Brian Patrick Clarke – John Aspinwall Roosevelt, youngest child of the Roosevelts
- Don Howard – Elliott Roosevelt, son of the Roosevelts who served in World War II
- Joseph Hacker – Franklin D. Roosevelt Jr., son of the Roosevelts who also served in the war
- Charles Lampkin – Irvin McDuffie, FDR's African-American valet during the White House years
- Arthur Gould-Porter – Sir Winston Churchill, Prime Minister of the United Kingdom
- Robert Karnes – United States Supreme Court Justice Charles Evans Hughes, frequent opponent of FDR in the courts. He also swore him in first 3 of the 4 times he was inaugurated.
- David Lewis – United States Supreme Court Justice Melville Weston Fuller, who swore in Teddy Roosevelt.
- Gregory Koontz – Curtis Roosevelt, eldest grandson of the Roosevelts; Anna's son from first marriage
- Davy Muxlow – John Roosevelt Boettiger, Roosevelt's grandson and Anna's son from second marriage

== Home media ==
The film was released on DVD by HBO Video on May 21, 2013, with Eleanor and Franklin (1976) on the second disc.
