= Terra Rubra =

Historic house in Maryland

- U.S. National Register of Historic Places
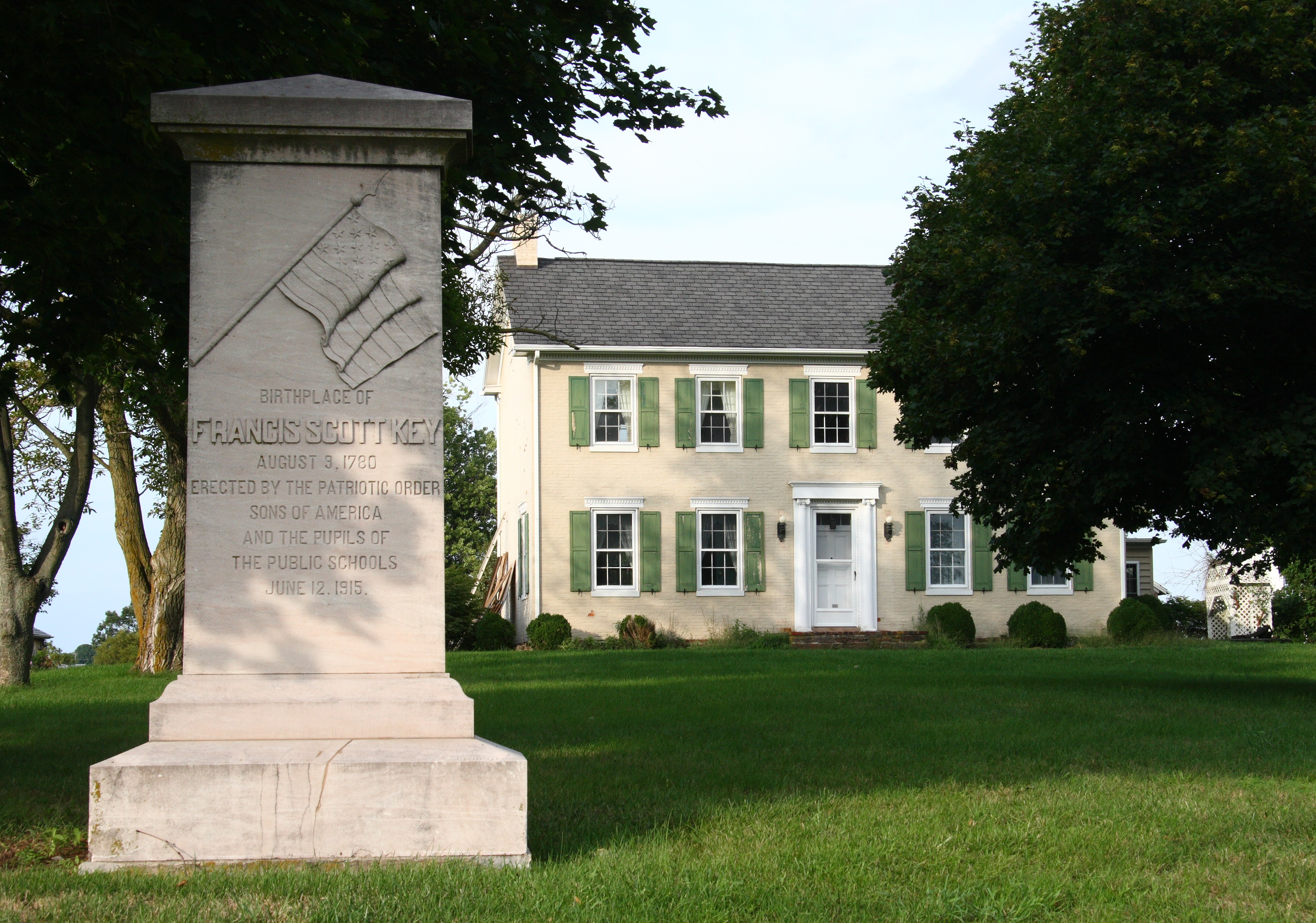
- Terra Rubra, September 2008

- Location within Maryland Location within the United States
- Location: 1755 Keysville Bruceville Road, near Keysville, Maryland
- Coordinates: 39°37′30″N 77°14′56″W
- Area: 158 acres (64 ha)
- Built: 1753, 1850s
- NRHP reference No.: 78001449
- Added to NRHP: July 24, 1978

Terra Rubra is a historic home and plantation located near Keysville, Carroll County, Maryland. It was the birth site of Francis Scott Key in 1779. The present Federal-style house was built in the 1850s after the Key residence had become badly deteriorated. The original house was built in the 1770s by Francis Key for his son John Ross Key, father of Francis Scott Key.

It was listed on the National Register of Historic Places in 1978.
