= Eleanor: The Years Alone =

1972 biography by Joseph P. Lash

- Author: Joseph P. Lash
- Subject: Biography
- Publisher: Norton
- Publication date: 1972
- Pages: 368

Eleanor: The Years Alone is a 1972 biography of Eleanor Roosevelt written by Joseph P. Lash. It is a companion volume to Eleanor and Franklin (1971), which covers her life through the death of her husband, United States President Franklin D. Roosevelt. Eleanor: The Years Alone describes her life thereafter.

== Bibliography ==
- Brown, Stuart Gerry (1973). "Review of Eleanor: The Years Alone". The Annals of the American Academy of Political and Social Science. 407: 224–225. doi:10.1177/000271627340700161. ISSN 0002-7162. JSTOR 1038809. S2CID 143823171.
- Daniels, Roger (1973). "Lash's Eleanor". Reviews in American History. 1 (1): 133–137. doi:10.2307/2701697. ISSN 0048-7511. JSTOR 2701697.
- Lask, Thomas (August 4, 1972). "Books of The Times". The New York Times. ISSN 0362-4331.
- Raymont, Henry (June 25, 1972). "New Book Recounts Mrs. Roosevelt's Criticisms of American Policy Concerning Palestine Early in 1948". The New York Times. ISSN 0362-4331.
- Book Review Digest 1972, p. 763 (and 1973)
