= Tom Loyless =

Tom W. Loyless (ca.1871 - March 19, 1926), now best known as the manager owner of the Warm Springs spa resort, owned by George Foster Peabody. Prior to managing the resort, Loyless, a native of west Georgia, served as a newspaper reporter, editor and publisher at papers in Augusta, Columbus and Macon. He was " one of the South's leading editorial voices, known for his fierce commentaries and a temper that matched."

== Life ==
As a young editor Loyless earned a reputation for bluntness and a fiery temper that did not always limit itself to print. An 1897 dispute with H.C. Hanson, editor of the rival Macon Morning Telegraph (later merged with Macon Evening News to form the Macon Telegraph) in which Loyless accused Hanson of bias in reporting became so heated that when meeting Hanson in person Loyless struck him. Hanson in turn drew a handgun.

=== Career ===
In 1903 Loyless and H.H. Cabiness acquired ownership of the Augusta Chronicle. By 1915 Loyless was editor of the few newspaper editors in Georgia to proclaim the innocence of Leo Frank and denounced his prosecutors as corrupt. The Chronicle supported Governor John M. Slaton in commuting Leo Frank's death sentence. Thomas E. Watson, publisher of Watson's Magazine and The Jeffersonian, openly advocated the lynching of Frank and defended the mob that attacked the Governor's home. For several weeks Loyless devoted almost his entire newspaper to confronting Watson. The Chronicle was practically alone among the daily newspapers to do so. In 1919 Loyless moved to the Columbus Enquirer-Sun. His editorials about Frank cost him his local popularity and made him an enemy of the Ku Klux Klan.

=== Warm Springs ===
Georgia banker and philanthropist George Foster Peabody had often visited the estate of his partner Spencer Trask in Saratoga Springs, New York, and in 1910 agreed to succeed him as chairman of the state commission set up to purchase and conserve the famous spa there. In 1923 Peabody acquired the Meriweather Inn at Warm Springs, Georgia near his boyhood home. Loyless had been leasing the Inn, and became Peabody's agent, managing the property.

Loyless proved an ambitious caretaker of the much-in-disrepair property. After a young man suffering from polio discovered that the springs helped him, Loyless and Warm Springs attracted the attention of Franklin D. Roosevelt, who had been stricken by a paralytic illness in 1921, diagnosed at the time as polio. Based on his own improvement, Roosevelt decided that Warm Springs could help victims of polio, and he worked together with Loyless on improvements to the resort and spa.

In March 1923, Loyless was in New York and addressed the Jewish Correspondence Bureau regarding the Frank case. Loyless remained at Warm Springs until his health failed due to cancer in 1925. An obituary (featuring the subheading "Georgia Editor Was an Unceasing Enemy of the Klan") appeared on page 19 of the March 22, 1926, issue of the New York Times.

Loyless is portrayed in the 2005 movie Warm Springs by Tim Blake Nelson. While the film gives the impression that Loyless was no longer active in newspapers at the time of Roosevelt's visits, he was in fact still involved with the Columbus (Georgia) Ledger (of which Loyless owned a percentage). Franklin Roosevelt contributed several editorials to the paper as a guest editor and nine guest-editorials for Loyless's former paper, the Macon Telegraph, which were syndicated nationally.
