= Rosemary Murphy =

German-American actress (1925–2014)

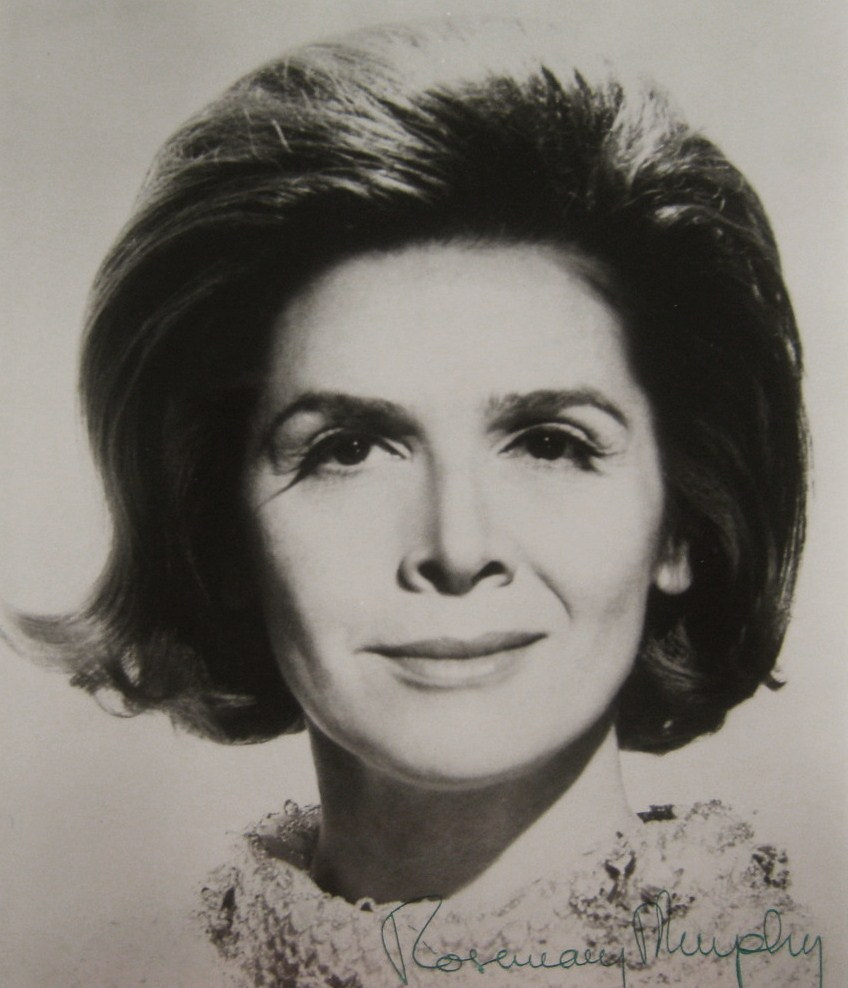
- Murphy in 1970
- Born: January 13, 1925; Munich, Germany
- Died: July 5, 2014 (aged 89); New York City, U.S.
- Occupation: Actress
- Years active: 1949–2010

Rosemary Murphy (January 13, 1925 – July 5, 2014) was an American actress of stage, film, and television. She was nominated for three Tony Awards for her stage work, as well as two Emmy Awards for television work, winning once, for her performance in Eleanor and Franklin (1976).

== Biography and career ==
Murphy was born in Munich, Germany on January 13, 1925, the elder daughter of American parents Robert Daniel Murphy, a diplomat, and Mildred Murphy (née Taylor). The family left Germany in 1939 due to the onset of World War II.

=== Education ===
Murphy, whose résumé came to include French and German films, attended Manhattanville College and trained as an actress at Catholic University of America in Washington, D.C., and in New York at the Neighborhood Playhouse and the Actors Studio with Sanford Meisner before beginning her career on stage.

=== Stage ===
Early in Murphy's career, which she later called her "rebellious stage", she acted with a repertory company and lived in a cold-water apartment. She made her stage debut in Germany, in a 1949 production of Peer Gynt. She made her Broadway debut in 1950 in The Tower Beyond Tragedy. She went on to appear in some 15 Broadway productions, most recently in Noël Coward's Waiting in the Wings (1999).

=== Film and television ===
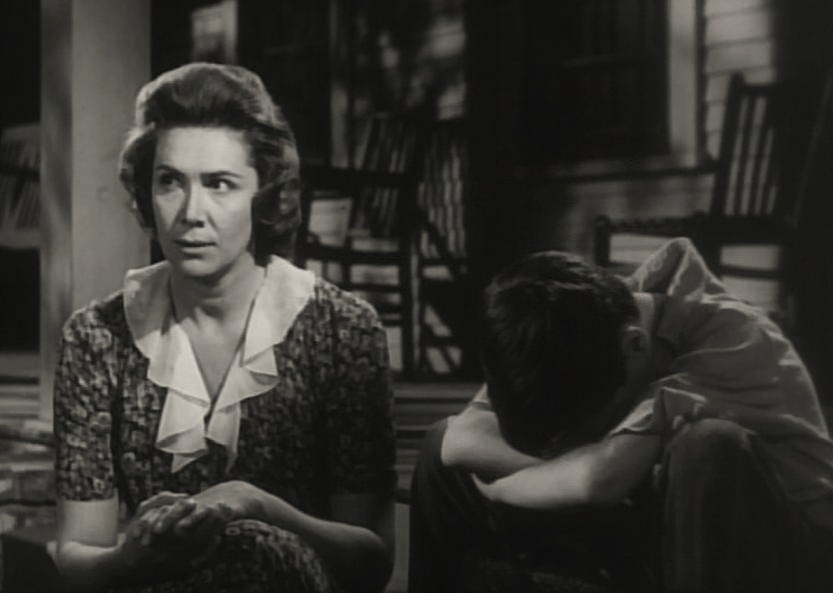
Rosemary Murphy with child actor Phillip Alford in To Kill a Mockingbird (1962)

Murphy also acted in films and on TV, most notably portraying Sara Delano Roosevelt in the TV miniseries Eleanor and Franklin (1976) and Eleanor and Franklin: The White House Years (1977). She played Maudie Atkinson in To Kill a Mockingbird (1962) as well as Callie Hacker in Walking Tall (1973). The following year, in 1974, she appeared in the television film A Case of Rape, playing a ruthless defense attorney who brutally cross-examines a rape victim (played by Elizabeth Montgomery) and wins an acquittal for the man who attacked her. In 1974–75, she played high-school principal Margaret Blumenthal in the series Lucas Tanner.

Her first soap opera role was Nola Hollister #2 on The Secret Storm (1969–1970). In 1977, she appeared on All My Children as Maureen Teller Dalton, Eric Kane's former mistress, and the mother of his son, Mark Dalton. In 1988, she played Loretta Kirkland for several months, the kleptomaniac mother of Mitch Blake and Sam Fowler on Another World. The following year, she appeared on As the World Turns as Gretel Aldin #2 (a role previously played by Joan Copeland) when her character's son, James Stenbeck, was allegedly murdered.

She also appeared in episodes of Columbo (1974) and Murder, She Wrote (1987).

=== Awards ===
Murphy won an Emmy Award for her role in Eleanor and Franklin and was nominated for an Emmy for her performance in the same role a year later in Eleanor and Franklin: The White House Years.. She also won a Clarence Derwent Award in 1961 for her work in Period of Adjustment. and an Outer Critics Circle Award and was nominated for a Tony Award.

== Death ==
She died on July 5, 2014, in Manhattan, from esophageal cancer. She never married or had children.

== Filmography ==
Year	Title	Role
1947	Der Ruf	Mary
1957	That Night!	Nurse 'Chorny' Chornis
1961	The Young Doctors	Miss Graves
1962	To Kill a Mockingbird	Maudie Atkinson
1966	Any Wednesday	Dorothy Cleves
1972	A Fan's Notes	Moms
1972	Ben	Beth Garrison
1972	You'll Like My Mother	Mrs. Kinsolving
1973	Walking Tall	Callie Hacker
1973	Ace Eli and Rodger of the Skies	Hannah
1973	40 Carats	Mrs. Latham
1974	A Case of Rape	Muriel Dyer
1977	Julia	Dottie
1980	The Attic	Mrs. Perkins
1981	The Hand	Karen Wagner
1987	September	Mrs. Mason
1991	For the Boys	Luanna Trott
1993	Twenty Bucks	Aunt Dotty
1995	Mighty Aphrodite	Adoption Coordinator
1999	Message in a Bottle	Helen at the B&B
2001	Dust	Angela
2007	The Savages	Doris Metzger
2008	Synecdoche, New York	Frances
2009	After.Life	Mrs. Whitehall
2010	The Romantics	Grandmother Hayes

=== Television films ===
Year	Title	Role	Notes
1968	A Case of Libel	Claire	
1972	Invitation to a March	—N/a	
1974	The Lady's Not for Burning	Margaret Devize	
1976	Eleanor and Franklin	Sara Roosevelt	Primetime Emmy Award for Outstanding Single Performance by a Supporting Actress in a Comedy or Drama Special
1977	Eleanor and Franklin: The White House Years	Sara Roosevelt	Nominated—Primetime Emmy Award for Outstanding Performance by a Supporting Actress in a Comedy or Drama Special
1978	Before and After	Helen, Carole's Mother	
1981	Mr. Griffin and Me	Jane Barlow	
1993	And the Band Played On	Blood Bank Executive	
1994	Don't Drink the Water	Miss Pritchard	
1995	The Tuskegee Airmen	Eleanor Roosevelt	
1999	The Hunt for the Unicorn Killer	Bea Einhorn	

=== Partial television credits ===
Year	Title	Role	Notes
1951–1953	Lux Video Theatre	Various roles	3 episodes
1962	The Virginian	Pearl Dodd Krause	Episode: "Big Day, Great Day"
1973	Maude	Jane	Episode: "Maude's Good Deed"
1974	Columbo	Margaret Halperin	Episode: "A Friend in Deed"
1976	Eleanor and Franklin	Sara Roosevelt	Primetime Emmy Award for Outstanding Single Performance by a Supporting Actress in a Comedy or Drama Special
1984	George Washington	Mary Ball Washington	
1996–1997	EZ Streets	Christina Quinn	4 episodes
1997	Cracker	Victoria	2 episodes
1997–1999	Frasier	Carol Larkin	2 episodes
1998	The Visitor	Tour Guide	Episode: "The Trial"
