= Earl Miller (bodyguard) =

American bodyguard of Eleanor Roosevelt (1897–1973)

Earl R. Miller Sr.
- Born: May 9, 1897
- Died: May 9, 1973 (aged 76); Hollywood, Florida
- Occupations: Navy officer, New York State Trooper
- Known for: bodyguard and close friend of Eleanor Roosevelt

Earl Miller (May 9, 1897 – May 9, 1973) was a New York State Trooper who was a bodyguard and close friend of future First Lady of the United States Eleanor Roosevelt during her term as First Lady of New York. Whether the pair's relationship included a romantic element has been a subject of debate among historians.

== Early life ==
At twelve years old, Miller left home. He served in the Navy during World War I; during this period, he became the Navy's middleweight boxing champion. He first met Eleanor's husband Franklin, then Assistant Secretary of the Navy, when assigned to escort him on a trip to France. Handsome and athletic, Miller had been an alternate for the US Olympic boxing team in the 1920 Summer Olympics at Antwerp, Belgium; he also worked for a time as a circus acrobat. After joining the New York State Police, he taught boxing and judo to cadets. He later served as the personal bodyguard of Governor of New York and 1928 Democratic presidential candidate Al Smith.

== Eleanor Roosevelt's bodyguard ==
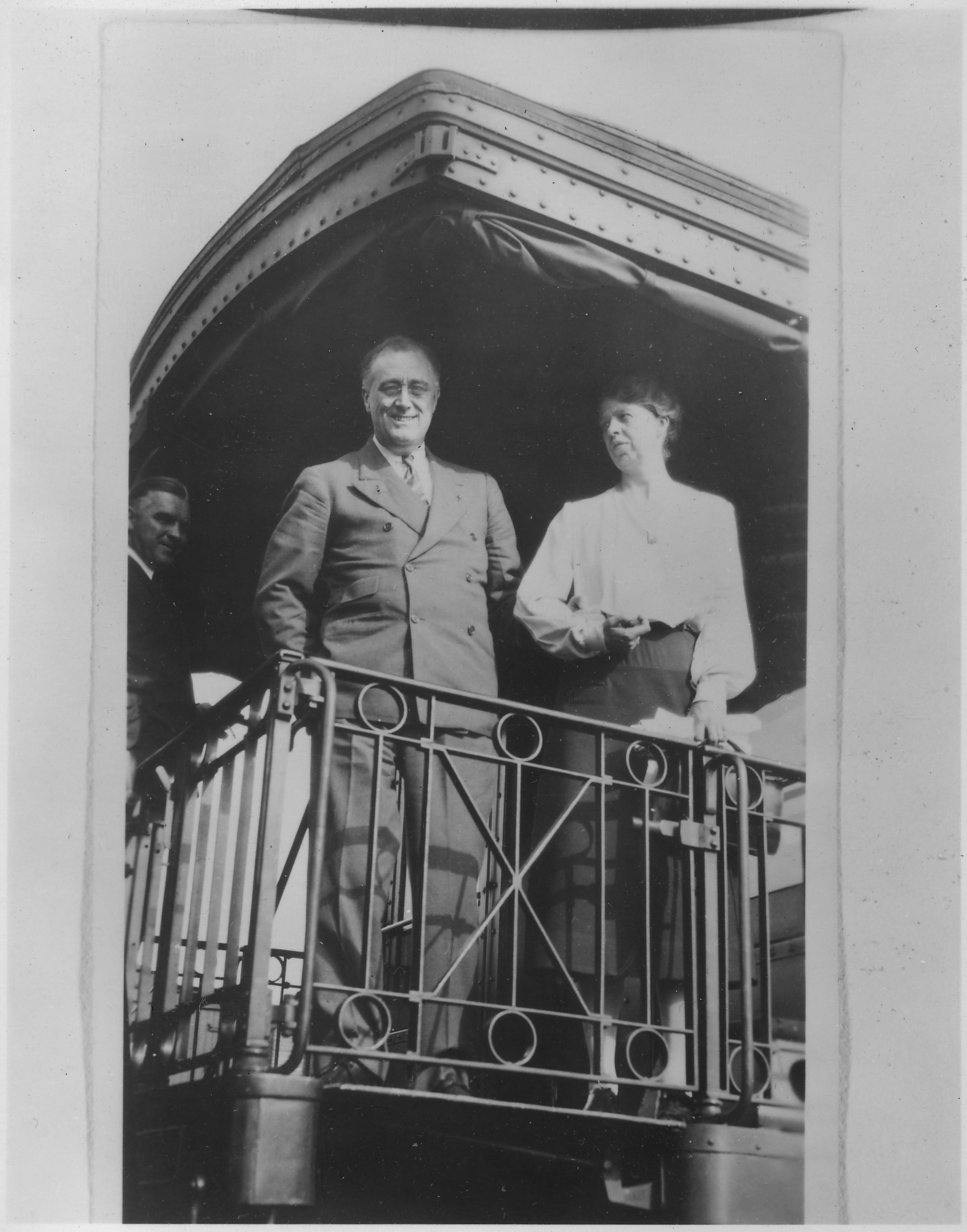
Franklin and Eleanor Roosevelt (foreground) and Earl Miller (background) in 1932

In 1928, Franklin D. Roosevelt was elected governor of New York. When Eleanor refused to be driven in the official limousine, preferring to drive herself, Franklin assigned Miller to be her bodyguard. Because Franklin's polio-induced paralysis kept him from regularly touring the state, Eleanor began making state visits and inspections in his place, accompanied by Miller. In the course of these trips, Eleanor and Miller quickly became close.

Miller gave Eleanor riding lessons, coached her in tennis and swimming, and taught her how to shoot targets with a pistol. He later bought her a chestnut mare, Dot, which Eleanor rode regularly. He also encouraged her to develop self-confidence, a trait Eleanor often lacked. Eleanor considered herself not photogenic, and attempted to hide from photographers early in her political career; Miller encouraged her to face reporters and smile, on occasion standing behind photographers to make faces at her.

Eleanor Roosevelt scholars continue to discuss whether the pair's relationship was romantic in nature. Franklin D. Roosevelt biographer Jean Edward Smith wrote that "whether they were more than good friends is open to conjecture." Eleanor Roosevelt biographer Blanche Wiesen Cook called Miller "the first romantic involvement of ER's middle years", but also stated that it was impossible to determine if the two were physically involved. Eleanor's son James described the relationship as possibly the "one real romance in mother's life outside of marriage", stating that Miller

encouraged her to take pride in herself, to be herself, to be unafraid of facing the world. He did a lot for her. She seemed to draw strength from him when he was by her side, and she came to rely on him ... He became part of the family, too, and gave her a great deal of what her husband and we, her sons, failed to give her. Above all, he made her feel that she was a woman.

Friends of the Roosevelts, such as Nancy Cook and Marion Dickerman, noted the physical familiarity between the pair, including regularly sitting with their hands on one another's knees. Miller himself acknowledged that rumors had existed about an affair–he even briefly dated Franklin's personal secretary Missy LeHand in an effort to distract from the gossip–but refused to write or speak about his years working for Eleanor in detail, stating, "I don't cash in on my friends". No letters between the pair are known to historians, and it is rumored that the correspondence was privately purchased to be hidden or destroyed.

Miller was married three times, two of which he later stated were to help put an end to rumors about himself and Eleanor, in 1932 and 1941, respectively: "That's why I got married in 1932 with plenty of publicity. I got married with someone I wasn't in love with. Same with the second marriage. But I was never successful in killing the gossip." He had two children with his third wife, Simone. When Simone filed for divorce in 1947, she threatened to name Eleanor as a co-respondent, presenting the court with copies of Earl and Eleanor's letters; the judge ordered the letters sealed, and the suit received little publicity.

== Later in life ==
In World War II, Miller re-enlisted in the Navy, serving as a lieutenant commander. At first a director of physical training for a naval station in Pensacola, Florida, he was later reassigned to New York, where he stayed in Eleanor's apartment. In the 1950s, he moved to Hollywood, Florida.

== Bibliography ==
- Cook, Blanche Wiesen (1992). Eleanor Roosevelt, Vol. 1. Penguin. ISBN 0140094601.
- Rowley, Hazel (2010). Franklin and Eleanor: An Extraordinary Marriage. Farrar, Straus and Giroux. ISBN 978-0-374-15857-6.
- Smith, Jean Edward (2007). FDR. Random House. ISBN 9780812970494.
