= Keysville station =

- Keysville Railroad Station
- U.S. National Register of Historic Places
- Virginia Landmarks Register
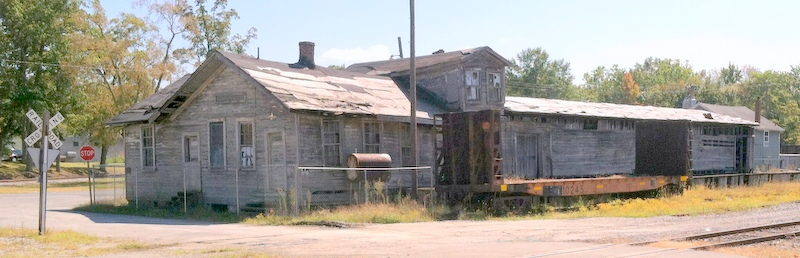

- Location within Virginia Location within the United States
- Location: Railroad Ave., Keysville, Virginia
- Coordinates: 37°2′23″N 78°29′6″W
- Area: less than one acre
- Built: 1890
- NRHP reference No.: 08001050
- VLR No.: 248-0001

Significant dates
- Added to NRHP: November 12, 2008
- Designated VLR: September 18, 2008

Keysville Railroad Station is a historic railway station located at Keysville, Charlotte County, Virginia. It was built by the Richmond and Danville Railroad in stages between 1890 and 1900, and is a one-story, vernacular frame railroad building. It contains offices and segregated waiting rooms at the north end and a large freight area extending to the south with docks on three sides. It remained in use as a passenger station until 1956. The Keysville Railroad Station appeared as the stations in Eastport, Maine, and in Warm Springs, Georgia, in the filming of Eleanor and Franklin, a television film about the Roosevelts that would earn 11 Emmy awards (1976).

It was listed on the National Register of Historic Places in 2008.

Preceding station	Southern Railway	Following station
Drake's Branch toward Danville	Danville – Richmond	Meherrin toward Richmond–Hull Street
Ontario toward East Durham	East Durham – Keysville	Terminus
