= Keysville, Maryland =

Unincorporated community in Maryland, U.S.

Coordinates: 39°38′02″N 77°15′31″W

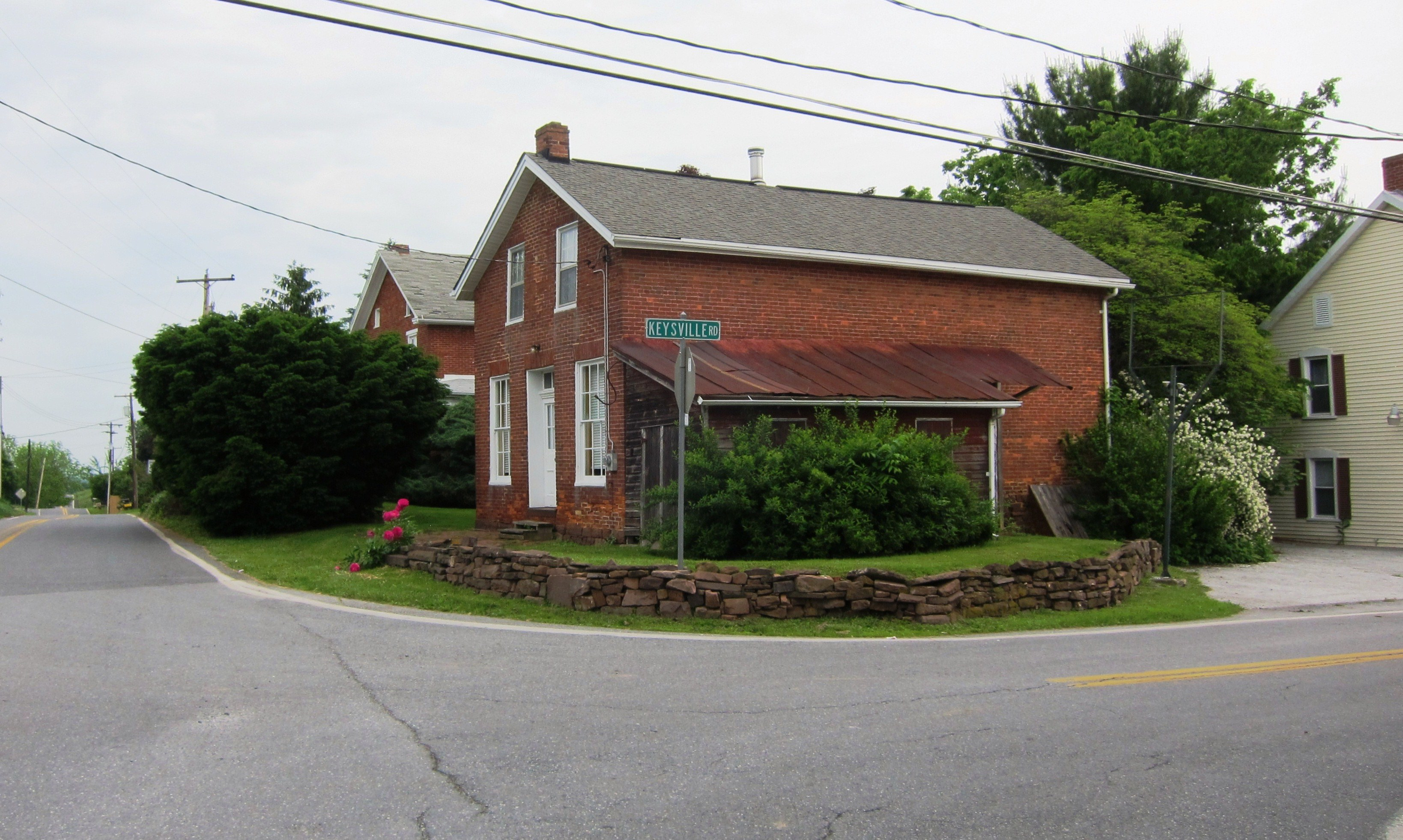
The intersection of Keysville and Bruceville Roads

Keysville is an unincorporated community in Carroll County, Maryland, United States. Terra Rubra was listed on the National Register of Historic Places in 1978.
