= Eleanor and Franklin (book) =

1971 biography by Joseph P. Lash

- Author: Joseph P. Lash
- Subject: Biography
- Publisher: Norton
- Publication date: 1971
- Pages: 765

Eleanor and Franklin: The Story of Their Relationship, Based on Eleanor Roosevelt's Private Papers is a 1971 biography of Eleanor Roosevelt written by Joseph P. Lash. Its companion volume, Eleanor: The Years Alone (1972), covers her life as a widow after Franklin D. Roosevelt's death.

The biography won the 1972 Pulitzer Prize for Biography.

== Bibliography ==
- Dallek, Robert (1977). "Eleanor et Franklin Roosevelt". Revue d'histoire de la Deuxième Guerre mondiale (in French). 27 (106): 125–127. ISSN 0035-2314. JSTOR 25728854.
- Daniels, Roger (1973). "Lash's Eleanor". Reviews in American History. 1 (1): 133–137. doi:10.2307/2701697. ISSN 0048-7511. JSTOR 2701697.
- Hareven, Tamara K. (1972). "Review of Eleanor and Franklin: The Story of their Relationship, based on Eleanor Roosevelt's Private Papers". The Journal of American History. 59 (1): 213–217. doi:10.2307/1888479. ISSN 0021-8723. JSTOR 1888479.
- Vidal, Gore (November 18, 1971). "Eleanor". The New York Review of Books. ISSN 0028-7504.
- https://archive.org/details/bookreviewdigest1971unse/page/792/mode/1up
- BRD 1972, p. 763
