= Dickerman =

Dickerman is a surname, primarily an Americanized form of the German surname Dickermann or an Ashkenazic Jewish variant related to Dick. Notable people with the surname include:

- C. Dickerman Williams (1900–1998), American lawyer
- Charles Heber Dickerman (1843–1915), American politician
- Ernie Dickerman (1910–1998), American conservationist
- Leah Dickerman, American art historian
- Leo Dickerman (1896–1982), American baseball player
- Marion Dickerman (1890–1983), American suffragist, educator, close friend of Eleanor Roosevelt
- Rob Dickerman, American neurological & spine surgeon
- Watson B. Dickerman (1846–1923), American banker
- Willard Dickerman Straight (1880–1918), American financier, publisher, and diplomat

== See also ==
- Dickman
