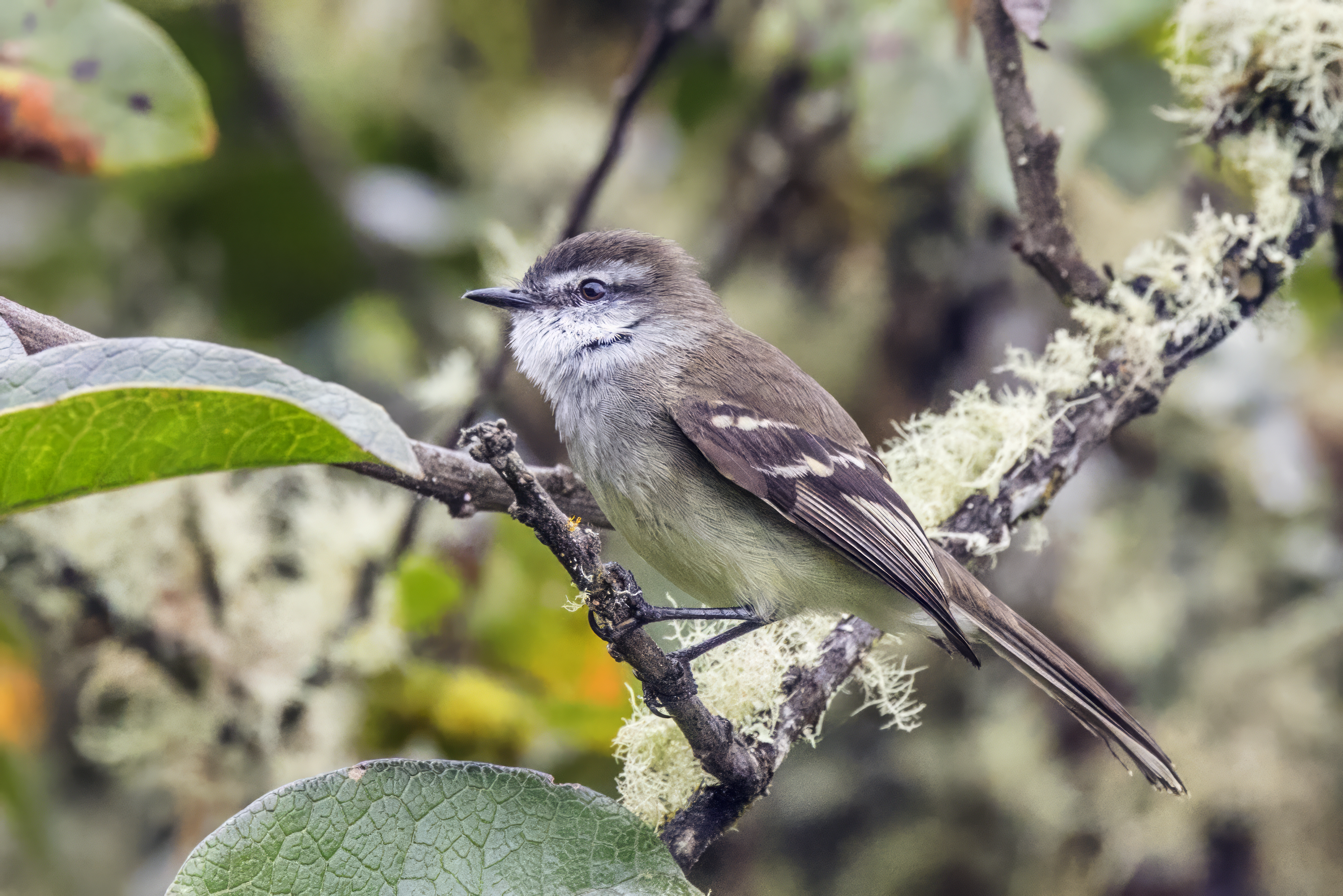
- Mecocerculus leucophrys setophagoides, Colombia

Conservation status
- Least Concern (IUCN 3.1)

Scientific classification
- Kingdom: Animalia
- Phylum: Chordata
- Class: Aves
- Order: Passeriformes
- Family: Tyrannidae
- Genus: Mecocerculus
- Species: M. leucophrys

Binomial name
- Mecocerculus leucophrys (D'Orbigny & Lafresnaye, 1837)

= White-throated tyrannulet =

Species of bird

The white-throated tyrannulet (Mecocerculus leucophrys) is a species of bird in subfamily Elaeniinae of family Tyrannidae, the tyrant flycatchers. It is found in Argentina, Bolivia, Brazil, Colombia, Ecuador, Peru, and Venezuela.

== Taxonomy and systematics ==
The International Ornithological Committee and the Clements taxonomy recognize these 11 subspecies of the white-throated tyrannulet:

- M. l. montensis (Bangs, 1899)
- M. l. chapmani Dickerman, 1985
- M. l. nigriceps Chapman, 1899
- M. l. notatus Todd, 1919
- M. l. setophagoides (Bonaparte, 1845)
- M. l. parui Phelps, WH & Phelps, WH Jr, 1950
- M. l. rufomarginatus (Lawrence, 1869)
- M. l. roraimae Hellmayr, 1921
- M. l. brunneomarginatus Chapman, 1924
- M. l. pallidior Carriker, 1933
- M. l. leucophrys (D'Orbigny & Lafresnaye, 1837)

BirdLife International's Handbook of the Birds of the World does not recognize M. l. montensis but includes it within M. l. nigriceps.

Some subspecies differ significantly in their morphology, suggesting that they might be separate species. M. l. pallidior has specifically been proposed as a species but not enough data are available for all of the taxa to make decisions.

This article follows the 11-subspecies model.

== Description ==
The white-throated tyrannulet is 11 to 14 cm (4.3 to 5.5 in) long. The sexes have the same plumage. Adults of the nominate subspecies M. l. leucophrys have a dark olive-gray crown and nape. They have white lores and a thin white supercilium on an otherwise dusky face with some white on the ear coverts. Their upperparts are medium olive-gray. Their wings are brownish black with cinnamon-buff to yellowish buff edges and tips on the flight feathers. Their wing coverts have cinnamon-buff tips that show as two wide bars on the closed wing. Their tail is dusky brown. Their throat is white which extends past the ear coverts; the feathers are puffy. They have a vest-like band of gray on their breast; the rest of their underparts are medium yellow. Both sexes of all subspecies have a dark brown iris, a long black bill, and black legs and feet.

The other subspecies of the white-throated tyrannulet differ from the nominate and each other thus:

- M. l. montensis: smaller than nominate with brownish upperparts and nearly white wingbars and flight feather edges
- M. l. chapmani: smaller than nominate with darker brownish (less olive-gray) upperparts, strong olive breast band, and richer yellow belly
- M. l. nigriceps: smaller than nominate with a more olive crown and back and nearly white wingbars and flight feather edges
- M. l. notatus: larger than nominate with more brownish upperparts, rich cinnamon-buff wingbars and flight feather edges, and slightly browner breast band
- M. l. setophagoides: larger than nominate with more brownish gray upperparts, paler wingbars, and a paler, creamy yellow, belly
- M. l. parui: smaller than nominate with darker brownish (less olive-gray) upperparts
- M. l. rufomarginatus: dark sepia-brown crown; warmer and richer brown upperparts than nominate with rich rufous wingbars and flight feather edges, warm brown wash on breast band and flanks, and paler yellow belly
- M. l. roraimae: smaller than nominate with much darker crown and upperparts and more ochraceous wingbars
- M. l. brunneomarginatus: dark sepia-brown crown; warmer and richer brown upperparts than nominate with medium rufous wingbars and flight feather edges and warm brown wash on breast band and flanks
- M. l. pallidior: paler, more grayish brown upperparts, wings, tail, and breast band

== Distribution and habitat ==
The subspecies of the white-throated tyrannulet are found thus:

- M. l. montensis: Sierra Nevada de Santa Marta in northern Colombia
- M. l. chapmani: Cerro Duida and Cerro Marahuaca in Venezuela's central Amazonas state
- M. l. nigriceps: Santa Marta region in Colombia and in northern Venezuela from Yaracuy east to Sucre and Monagas states
- M. l. notatus: Colombia's Western and Central Andes south to Cauca Department
- M. l. setophagoides: Eastern Andes of Colombia between Norte de Santander and Cundinamarca departments, Andes of northwestern Venezuela between Táchira and Lara states, and the Serranía del Perijá on the border between the countries
- M. l. parui: Cerro Parú in Venezuela's north-central Amazonas
- M. l. rufomarginatus: Andes from Nariño Department in southwestern Colombia south through Ecuador into northwestern Peru's Department of Piura
- M. l. roraimae: the tepuis of Venezuela's Amazonas and Bolívar states (except those occupied by chapmani and parui), extreme northern Brazil, and western Guyana
- M. l. brunneomarginatus: eastern Andes of Peru south to Cuzco Department
- M. l. pallidior: western Andes of Peru in Ancash and northern Lima departments
- M. l. leucophrys: eastern Andes from southern Peru's Cuzco and Madre de Dios departments south into northern Argentina as far as La Rioja Province

The white-throated tyrannulet inhabits a variety of temperate landscapes in the Andes and other mountains. These include the interior and edges of humid montane forest, stunted cloudforest, elfin forest, Polylepis woodland, and clearings and pastures with many shrubs. In elevation it occurs between 2,500 and 3,600 m (8,200 and 11,800 ft) in Colombia, mostly between 2,800 and 3,500 m (9,200 and 11,500 ft) in Ecuador, between 1,800 and 4,600 m (5,900 and 15,100 ft) in Peru, between 1,350 and 3,700 m (4,400 and 12,100 ft) in western Venezuela, between 1,300 and 2,450 m (4,300 and 8,000 ft) in eastern Venezuela, and mostly above 1,300 m (4,300 ft) in Brazil.

== Behavior ==
=== Movement ===
The white-throated tyrannulet is mostly a resident species but makes some elevational movements during the austral winter or local wet season.

=== Feeding ===
The white-throated tyrannulet feeds mostly on insects and spiders but also includes some small fruits in its diet. It usually forages singly or in pairs and regularly joins mixed-species feeding flocks. It perches upright (unusual for a tyrannulet), and takes most of its food by gleaning from leaves and twigs, sometimes hanging underneath, and sometimes with short flights to briefly hover.

=== Breeding ===
The white-throated tyrannulet's breeding season has not been fully defined but spans from December to March in Argentina and possibly as long as January to August in Colombia. Its nest is a cup made of plant fibers and wool, moss, and spider web. It is typically placed on a horizontal branch between about 1.4 and 4 m (5 and 13 ft) above the ground. The usual clutch is two eggs. The incubation period, time to fledging, and details of parental care are not known.

=== Vocalization ===
The white-throated tyrannulet's dawn song is "an excited-sounding 'ch'd'dik, ch'd'dik, ch'd'dik, chéw' " with some variations in emphasis and sometimes some "kee-keek" notes inserted. While foraging it often gives a "pit" or "pif" note.

== Status ==
The IUCN has assessed the white-throated tyrannulet as being of Least Concern. It has a very large range; its population size is not known and is believed to be stable. No immediate threats have been identified. It is widespread and considered uncommon to very common in different parts of its range. It occurs in most or all of the protected areas within its range.
