= Dickmann =

Dickmann is a German surname. Notable people with the surname include:

- Arend Dickmann (1572–1627), Polish Navy admiral
- Barbara Dickmann (born 1942), German journalist
- Bernard F. Dickmann (1888–1971), American politician
- Friedrich Dickmann, German politician
- Lorenzo Dickmann (born 1996), Italian footballer

== See also ==
- Ernst Dickmanns, German computer scientist
- Dickman
