= Around the World in 80 Minutes with Douglas Fairbanks =

1931 film

- Directed by: Douglas Fairbanks; Victor Fleming
- Screenplay by: Robert E. Sherwood
- Starring: Douglas Fairbanks
- Cinematography: Victor Fleming; Henry Sharp
- Music by: Alfred Newman
- Production company: Elton Corporation
- Distributed by: United Artists
- Release date: December 12, 1931
- Running time: 80 minutes
- Country: United States
- Language: English
- Box office: $200,000

Around the World in 80 Minutes with Douglas Fairbanks is a 1931 American Pre-Code documentary film directed by Douglas Fairbanks and Victor Fleming and written by Robert E. Sherwood. The film was released on December 12, 1931, by United Artists.

== Synopsis ==
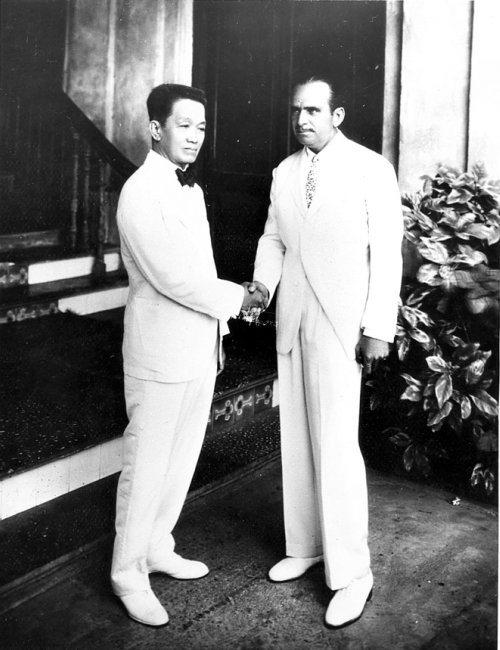
Douglas Fairbanks (right) meeting the former President of the Philippines Emilio Aguinaldo (left) in March 1931

Douglas Fairbanks, Sr. and a crew of three — photographers Harry Sharp and Chuck Lewis and co-director Victor Fleming — journey around the World and report on various cultural curiosities and the humor they find in everyday life overseas. Beginning with Japan, Fairbanks focuses on the people and observes a Japanese woman demonstrating how her maids assemble her headdress. Fairbanks and his crew then travel to China, where they are greeted by one of China's greatest actors, female impersonator Mei Lanfang. Further travels take them to the walls of the Forbidden City in Peking, the tomb of Dr Sun Yat-sen and the city of Hong Kong. En route, Fairbanks exercises aboard the ocean liner Belgenland, displaying his athlete's physique while doing deck drills. He is also shown playing golf. In Indochina the Maharanee of Cooch-Behar provides Fairbanks with fifty elephants and attendants for an expedition into the jungle to hunt leopards. In the Philippines, Fairbanks films former President of the Philippines Emilio Aguinaldo as he poses and speaks for the camera. After passing through Cambodia and Bangkok, Fairbanks stops in Siam, where he visits a party attended by many foreign dignitaries at the estate of the King of Siam.

At this point, the live action is interrupted by a short animated sequence of Mickey Mouse dancing to Siamese music. In India, the film focuses on the Taj Mahal, life on the Ganges river, a Hindu cremation ceremony, a performance of trained birds stringing beads, the Palace of Kushabaha and an elephant trip to hunt for a leopard. The film concludes with a "magic carpet" ride back to Hollywood, which incorporates aerial footage of Chicago and the Los Angeles basin.

== Home media ==
The film was released on a manufactured-on-demand DVD-R on May 29, 2012 and on DVD on October 15, 2019.
