= Dickman =

Dickman is a surname. Notable people with the surname include:

- Emerson Dickman (1914–1981), relief pitcher in Major League Baseball who played his entire career for the Boston Red Sox
- Franklin J. Dickman (1828–1908), Republican politician in the U.S. State of Ohio, Ohio Supreme Court Judge 1886–1895
- James B. Dickman born in 1949, an American photographer, won the 1983 Pulitzer Prize for feature photography
- Jill Dickman, Republican member of the Nevada Assembly
- John Dickman (1864–1910), Englishman hanged for murder
- Jonjo Dickman (born 1981), English football midfielder
- Joseph T. Dickman (1857–1927), United States Army general
- Matthew Dickman (born 1975), American poet
- Michael Dickman (born 1975), American poet

== See also ==
- A. P. Dickman House, historic home in Ruskin, Florida, United States
- Caparo Industries plc v Dickman, leading English tort law case on the test for a duty of care
- Dickman function ρ is a special function used to estimate the proportion of smooth numbers up to a given bound
- Golomb–Dickman constant arises in the theory of random permutations and in number theory
- USS Joseph T. Dickman (APA-13), Harris-class attack transport that served with the US Navy during World War II
- Dickmann (surname)
