= Nancy Cook =

20th-century American businesswoman and suffragist

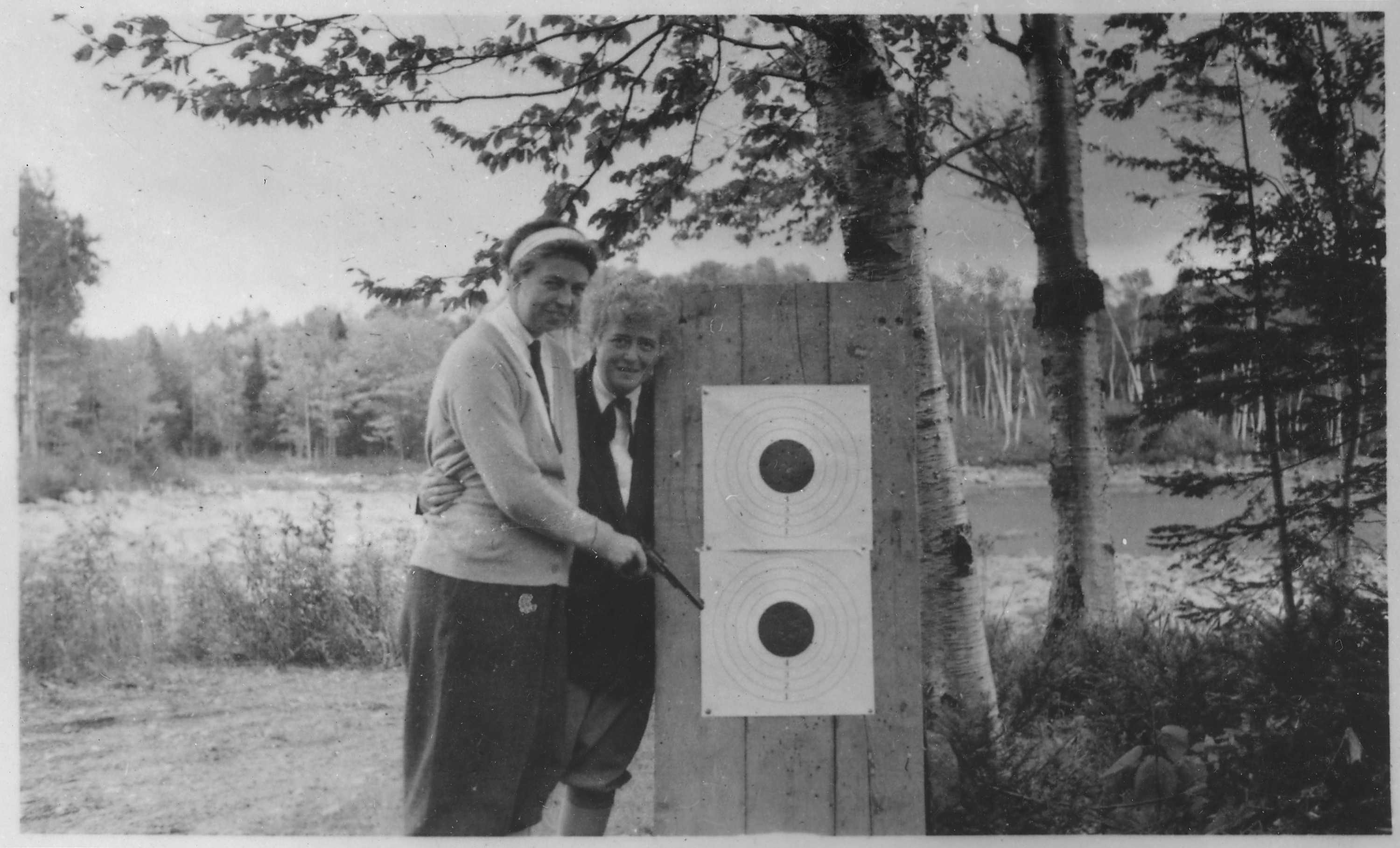
Nancy Cook with Eleanor Roosevelt, in 1934

Nancy Cook (August 26, 1884 – August 16, 1962) was an American suffragist, educator, political organizer, business woman, and friend of Eleanor Roosevelt. She, Marion Dickerman and Roosevelt, were co-owners of Val-Kill Industries, the Women's Democratic News, and the Todhunter School.

== Birth and early life ==
Born in Massena, New York, she attended Syracuse University where she was an avid supporter of woman's suffrage and campaigned for protective labor legislation for women. She was graduated with a bachelor's degree in arts in 1912.

== Career ==
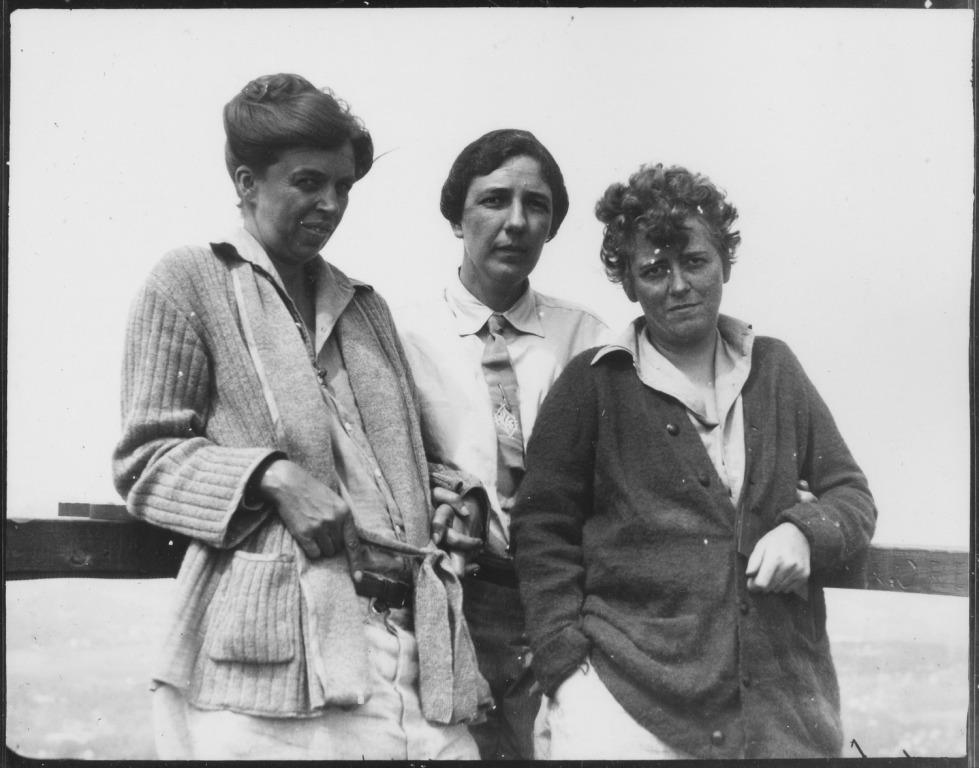
Eleanor Roosevelt, Marion Dickerman, and Nancy Cook on Campobello Island, New Brunswick, Canada, in June 1926

From 1913 to 1918 she taught art and handicrafts to high school students in Fulton, New York. It was here that she met Syracuse classmate Marion Dickerman, who taught history at the high school. These two women become lifelong partners, spending almost their entire adult lives together.

Her respect for Woodrow Wilson's vision overcame her strong antiwar sentiments and she and Dickerman both became active in the Red Cross. As Dickerman later recounted, they "really believed this was a war to end wars and make the world safe for democracy." In 1918, they both traveled to London to assist the women-staffed Endell Street Military Hospital and "scrub floors or perform whatever other chores were required." Cook would, with less than two weeks training, begin to make artificial limbs for soldiers that had lost an arm or a leg.

== Political activist ==
Upon their return from Europe, Dickerson had been asked to run for the state assembly. Although Dickerson had little chance to unseat the incumbent speaker of the assembly, Cook's work in managing Dickerson's campaign did not go unnoticed. Cook, who had never felt teaching to be her element, was delighted when Harriet May Mills, chair of the Women's Division of the New York Democratic Party asked Cook if she would accept the position as executive secretary, a post she would hold for nineteen years. She held an important role in Al Smith and Franklin Roosevelt's gubernatorial and presidential campaigns.

Cook and Dickerman became frequent guests of the Roosevelts. In 1929 Cook, Dickerman and Eleanor Roosevelt visited Europe together.

== Val-Kill Industries ==
Franklin encouraged Eleanor Roosevelt to develop land near the Fall Kill Creek as a place that she could promote some of her ideas to provide winter jobs for rural workers and women. The three women, with FDR's encouragement, built Stone Cottage at Val-Kill, on the banks of the Fall Kill creek. Cook and Dickerman made this their home and Eleanor had her own room, although she rarely spent the night. Cook, an expert woodworker, made all furniture. Towels, linens, and various household items were monogrammed "EMN", using the three women's initials.

In 1927, Val-Kill Industries was founded by friends, Eleanor Roosevelt, Nancy Cook, Marion Dickerman, and Caroline O'Day (Associate Chairwoman of the New York State Democratic Committee). The women established the project to provide work for immigrants, but also to farmers on their off-seasons as a means for them to support their families through the less profitable times of the year, by producing furniture in the Colonial Revival Style that was sweeping through America at the time. They hoped the factory would be a haven for small-town people during off-seasons and would provide many full-time jobs to those in need. Dickerman and O'Day were financial investors, but not actively involved in the business. Cook managed the daily operations of the business until it closed in 1936. The project failed to survive during the Great Depression, closing due to setbacks and Eleanor's need to focus on her duties as First Lady.

Thrilled with FDR's victory, Cook and Dickerman found it difficult to understand Eleanor's anxiety over her role as first lady. When Val-Kill Industries dissolved in 1936, Eleanor moved out of the Stone Cottage and had the factory building remodeled.

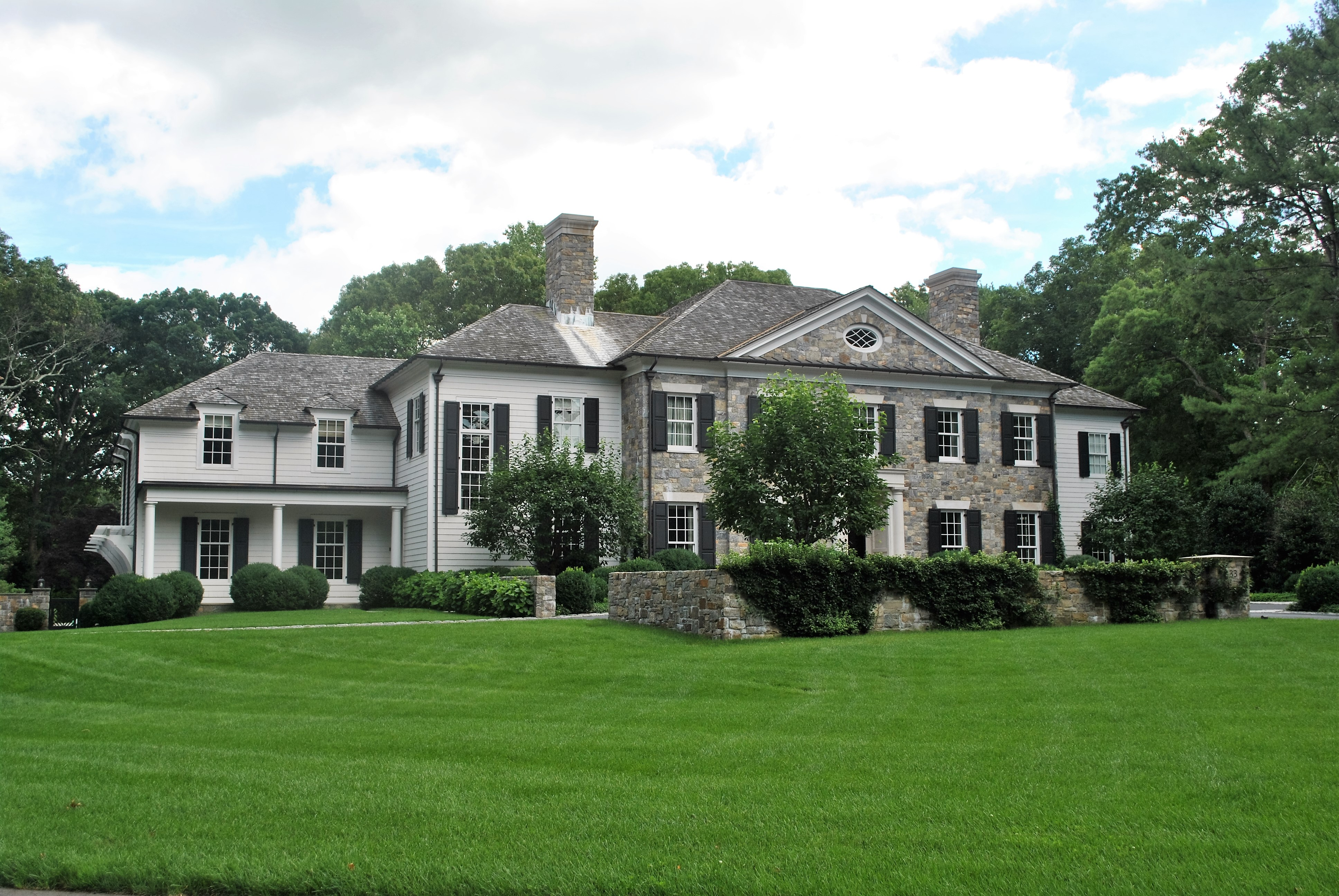
Marion Dickerman and Nancy Cook House, New Caanan, CT

Lorena Hickok took an active dislike to Dickerman and this started to unravel the relationship between the three. Dickerman and Cook continued to live in Stone Cottage until after Franklin D. Roosevelt's death in 1945. They sold all interest in the Val-Kill property to Eleanor in 1947 when they moved to New Canaan, Connecticut, where Dickerman became the educational programming director for the Marine Museum.

Cook lived there with Dickerman until her death and is buried next to Dickerman at Westfield Cemetery, Westfield, New York.

== Sources ==
- Cook, Blanche Wiesen. Eleanor Roosevelt: Volume One, 1884-1933. New York: Viking Press, 1993
- Cook, Blanche Wiesen. Eleanor Roosevelt: Volume Two, 1933-1938. New York: Viking Press, 1999
- Davis, Kenneth. Invincible Summer: An Intimate Portrait of the Roosevelts Based on the Recollections of Marion Dickerman. New York: Atheneum Press, 1974
