= Marion Dickerman =

American suffragist, educator, close friend of Eleanor Roosevelt (1890–1983)

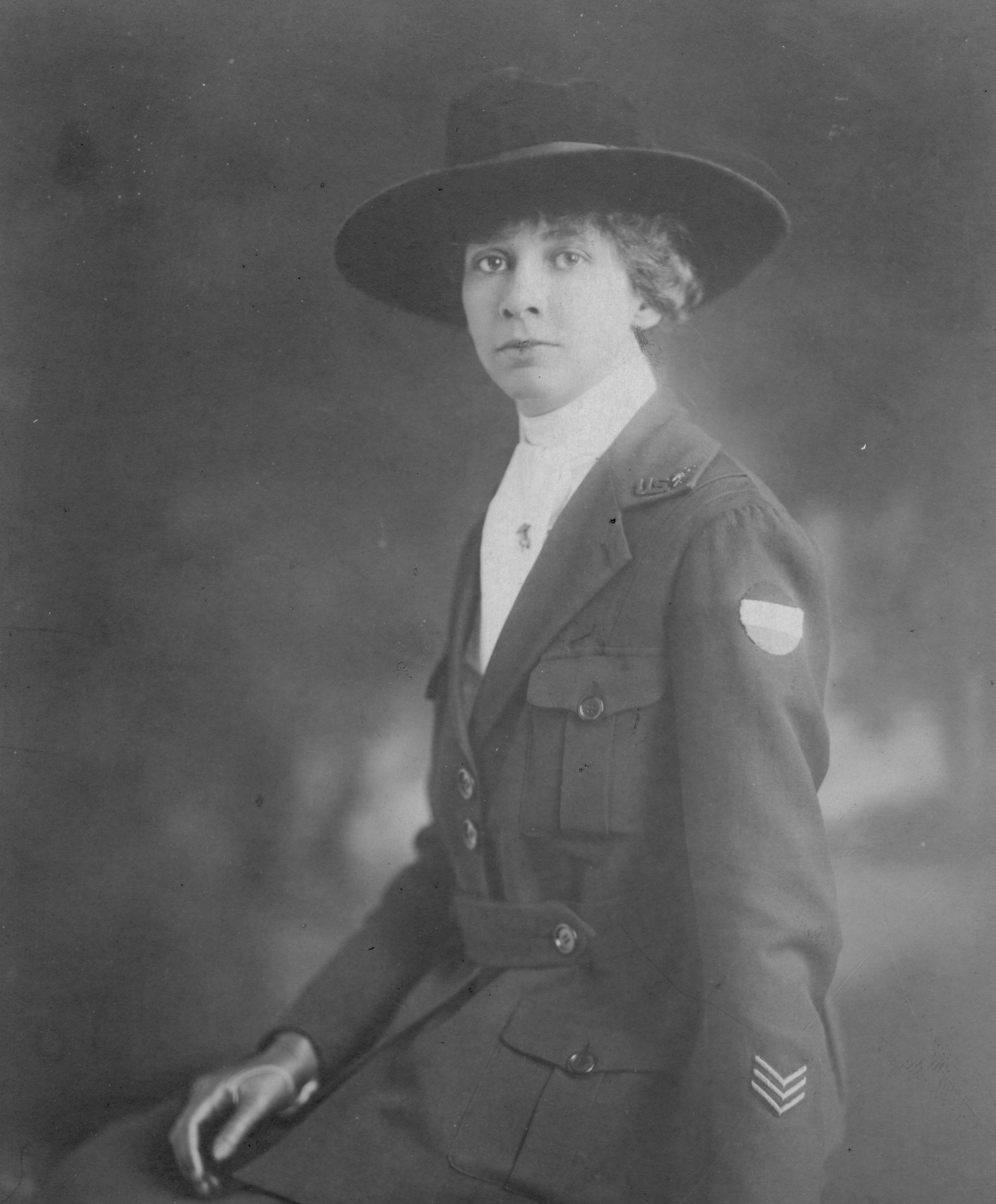
- Born: April 11, 1890; Westfield, New York, U.S.
- Died: May 16, 1983 (aged 93); Kennett Square, Pennsylvania, U.S.
- Education: Wellesley College; Syracuse University
- Occupations: Suffragist, educator
- Partner: Nancy Cook

Marion Dickerman (April 11, 1890 – May 16, 1983) was an American suffragist, educator, vice-principal of the Todhunter School, and a close friend of Eleanor Roosevelt.

== Birth and early life ==
Born in Westfield, New York, she studied for two years at Wellesley College before transferring to Syracuse University where she became involved in women's suffrage. She graduated with a bachelor of arts in 1911 and a graduate degree in education in 1912.

== Career ==
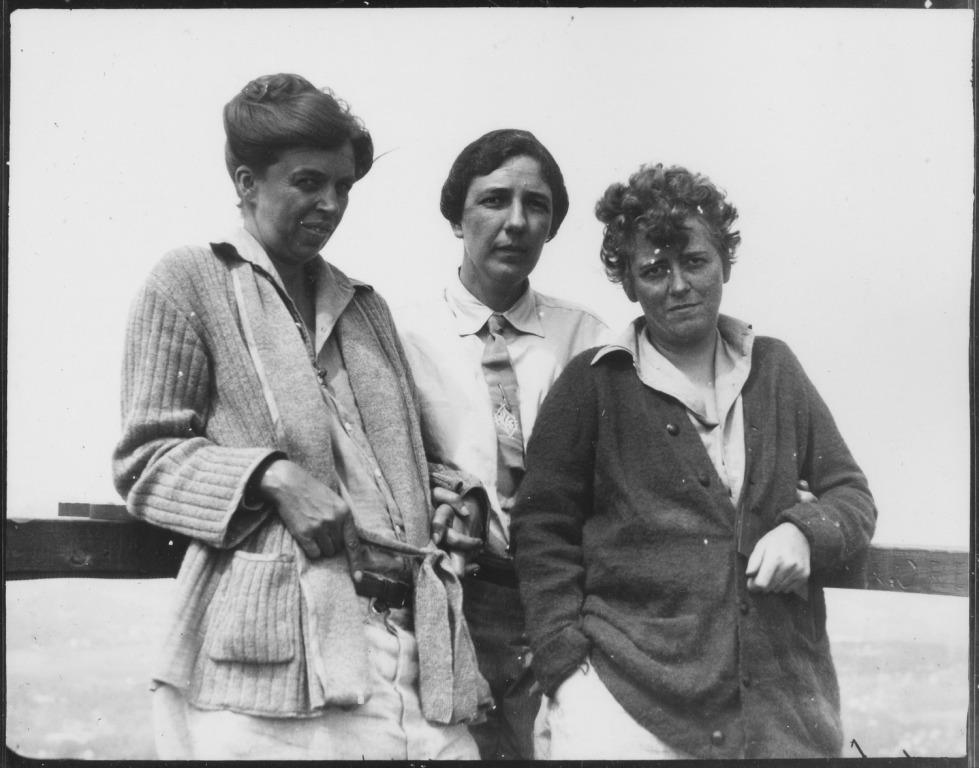
Eleanor Roosevelt, Marion Dickerman, and Nancy Cook on Campobello Island, New Brunswick, Canada, in June 1926

She taught first at Canisteo, New York, and in 1913, moved to Fulton, New York, where she taught American history at Fulton High School. It was here that she became close friends with Nancy Cook, who taught arts and handicrafts at the same school. These two women become lifelong partners, spending almost their entire adult lives together, sharing a life dedicated to politics, education, and progressive reform. Dickerman was head of the Fulton High history department for four years before she left the school in 1918.

Despite having anti-war sentiments, during World War I, she and Cook both became active in the Red Cross. As Dickerman later recounted, she "really believed this was a war to end wars and make the world safe for democracy." In Spring of 1918, they both traveled to London where they worked at the Endell Street Military Hospital. Upon return to the United States, Dickerman found that she had been nominated to oppose Thaddeus C. Sweet, an anti-suffragist politician for a seat in the New York State Assembly. Dickerman ran, taking votes away from Sweet, who was then unable to secure the Republican nomination for governor. Between 1919 and 1920, she was the Executive Secretary of the Women's Joint Legislative Conference.

From 1920 to 1921, she worked as dean at the Trenton State College in Trenton, New Jersey. Unhappy there, she one year later joined the faculty of the Todhunter School. In 1922, she and Cook met Eleanor Roosevelt. The three women shared similar values and quickly became good friends. Franklin Roosevelt offered the three women a lifetime lease on some property near Vall-Kill Creek to build a cottage. A small handicraft workshop was also built, which became known as Vall-Kill Industries.

In 1927, Dickerman, Roosevelt, and Cook purchased the Todhunter School, with Dickerman becoming principal. She worked there until as the principal until 1937, and later, stayed on in "an administrative capacity until 1942." By 1936, Val-Kill Industries was disbanded. Dickerman was appointed to a 1938 Presidential Commission to study industrial relations in both Great Britain and Sweden. Later in 1942, she was appointed to the National Labor Relations Board, where she served until 1945.

Dickerman and Cook continued to live in Stone Cottage until after Franklin D. Roosevelt's death in 1945. Dickerman and Cook sold all interest in the Val-Kill property to Eleanor in 1947 when they moved to New Canaan, Connecticut, where Dickerman became the educational programming director for the Marine Historical Association, which later became Mystic Seaport, the Museum of America and the Sea. She served as the museum's Director of Education, a post she held from 1946 until 1962. When Val-Kill was being restored, Dickerman provided the National Park Service more than 170 pieces of furniture and other household items from her time living in the cottage.

Dickerman died in 1983 at the age of 93 at the Crossroads retirement home in Kennett Square, Pennsylvania, and is buried next to Nancy Cook at Westfield Cemetery, Westfield, New York.

== Sources ==
- Cook, Blanche Wiesen. Eleanor Roosevelt: Volume One, 1884-1933. New York: Viking Press, 1993
- Cook, Blanche Wiesen. Eleanor Roosevelt: Volume Two, 1933-1938. New York: Viking Press, 1999
- Davis, Kenneth. Invincible Summer: An Intimate Portrait of the Roosevelts Based on the Recollections of Marion Dickerman. New York: Atheneum Press, 1974
