= The First Lady (American TV series) =

American anthology drama television series

- Genre: Anthology; Biographical drama
- Created by: Aaron Cooley
- Directed by: Susanne Bier
- Starring: Viola Davis; Michelle Pfeiffer; Gillian Anderson; O-T Fagbenle; Kiefer Sutherland; Aaron Eckhart; Dakota Fanning; Lily Rabe; Regina Taylor
- Music by: Geoff Zanelli
- Opening theme: "This Land Is Your Land" by Sharon Jones & the Dap-Kings
- Country of origin: United States
- Original language: English
- No. of seasons: 1
- No. of episodes: 10

Production
- Executive producers: Jeff Gaspin; Brad Kaplan; Aaron Cooley; Pavlina Hatoupis; Alyson Feltes; Viola Davis; Julius Tennon; Andrew Wang; Cathy Schulman; Susanne Bier
- Cinematography: Amir Mokri
- Editors: Sam Williams; Matthew Cannings; Lindsey Woodward; Nicolas Chaudeurge
- Running time: 55–57 minutes
- Production companies: Welle Entertainment; Pathless Woods Productions Inc.; Lionsgate Television

Original release
- Network: Showtime
- Release: April 17 – June 19, 2022

The First Lady is an American anthology drama television series created by Aaron Cooley that premiered on Showtime on April 17, 2022. It stars Michelle Pfeiffer, Viola Davis, and Gillian Anderson, among others, and portrays life and family events of three first ladies of the United States: Eleanor Roosevelt, Betty Ford, and Michelle Obama. The series received mixed reviews, with praise for the performances, as well as the costumes, set design, and themes, but criticism for the pacing and plot. In August 2022, the series was canceled after one season. The show premiered on some PBS stations, syndicated by American Public Television on October 1, 2024.

== Cast and characters ==
=== Main ===
- Viola Davis as Michelle Obama
  - Jayme Lawson as young Michelle
- Michelle Pfeiffer as Betty Ford
  - Kristine Froseth as young Betty
- Gillian Anderson as Eleanor Roosevelt
  - Eliza Scanlen as young Eleanor
- O-T Fagbenle as Barack Obama
  - Julian De Niro as young Barack
- Kiefer Sutherland as Franklin D. Roosevelt
  - Charlie Plummer as young Franklin
- Aaron Eckhart as Gerald Ford
  - Jake Picking as young Gerald
- Dakota Fanning as Susan Ford
  - Arlo Mertz as young Susan
- Lily Rabe as Lorena Hickok, Eleanor Roosevelt's journalist friend
- Regina Taylor as Marian Robinson, Michelle Obama's mother

=== Recurring ===
- Clea DuVall as Malvina Thompson (1893–1953, served 1929–1953)
- Jackie Earle Haley as Louis Howe (1871–1936, served 1933–1936)
- Kate Mulgrew as Susan Sher
- Derek Cecil as Donald Rumsfeld (1932–2021)
- Michael Potts as Fraser Robinson III (1935–1991)
- Rhys Wakefield as Dick Cheney (1941-2025)
- Ellen Burstyn as Sara Roosevelt (1854–1941)
- Judy Greer as Nancy Howe
- Lexi Underwood as Malia Obama (born 1998)
- Cayden Boyd as Michael Ford
  - Gavin White as young Michael Ford
- Marc Hills as Jack Ford
  - Jack Schmeichel as young Jack Ford
- Ben Cook as Steven Ford (born 1956)
  - Paul Holcomb as young Steven Ford
- Leslie Kritzer as Martha Graham
- Thomas E. Sullivan as Bill Warren
- Patrice Johnson Chevannes as Clara Powell
- Saniyya Sidney as Sasha Obama (born 2001)
- Evan Parke as SS Allen Taylor
- Gloria Reuben as Valerie June Jarrett (born 1956)
- Rosalind Chao as Tina Tchen
- Donna Lynne Champlin as Melissa "Mel" Winter
- Cailee Spaeny as Anna Eleanor Roosevelt (1906–1975)
  - Olivia Cannon as young Anna Roosevelt
- Maria Dizzia as Lucy Mercer Rutherfurd (1891–1948)
- Bernadette Quigley as Esther Lape
- Maurice P. Kerry as Cassius

=== Guest ===
- Kathleen Garrett as Laura Bush, 43rd First Lady of the United States (born 1946, served 2001–2009)
- Mark Moses as George W. Bush, 43rd President of the United States (born 1946, served 2001-2009)
- Paul Wilson as Richard Nixon, 37th President of the United States (1913–1994, served 1969–1974)
- Judy Ann McDowell as Pat Nixon, 37th First Lady of the United States (1912–1993, served 1969–1974)
- Jeremy Bobb as Theodore Roosevelt, 26th President of the United States (1858–1919, served 1901–1909)
- Kate Burton as Hillary Clinton, 42nd First Lady of the United States (born 1947, served 1993–2001), former secretary of state (2009-2013), and Democratic nominee of the 2016 U.S. election
- Robert Sean Leonard as Harry S. Truman, 33rd President of the United States (1884–1972, served 1945–1953)
- John Schmedes as George H. W. Bush, 41st President of the United States (1924–2018, served 1989–1993)
- Chuck Cooper as Martin Luther King Sr.
- Shannon Purser as Peg
- Joe Chrest as Dr. Pursh

== Episodes ==
No.	Title	Directed by	Written by	Original release date	U.S. viewers (millions)
1	"That White House"	Susanne Bier	Teleplay by : Aaron Cooley and Ellen Fairey & Jennifer Westfeldt & Hunt Baldwin and Abby Ajayi & Zora Bikangaga; Story by : Aaron Cooley	April 17, 2022	0.263
In 2008, Barack Obama won the 2008 presidential election, becoming the first African American president. Following the election, the Obama family moved from Chicago to Washington, D.C., where they were welcomed to the White House by the Bush family. In 1973, Spiro Agnew resigned as vice president, and Michigan Republican Congressman Gerald Ford is sworn is as the new vice president, making his wife, Betty Ford, the new second lady. In 1921, Franklin D. Roosevelt was paralyzed by a paralytic illness affecting his legs and was diagnosed with polio. In 1928, Roosevelt had recovered but was unable to walk. In 1974, Alberta Williams King, the mother of Martin Luther King Jr., was shot and killed. Betty and her daughter Susan attended her funeral. In 2007, in Chicago, Michelle Obama received a phone call from her daughter Sasha, who reported that suspicious people were outside their house because her husband was one of the Democratic candidates for the 2008 presidential election. In 1981, a young Michelle tells her family that she has been accepted to Princeton University. In 1933, FDR becomes president after winning the 1932 presidential election, and Eleanor Roosevelt becomes the first lady. Also in 1974, Gerald tells Betty that Nixon has resigned as president because of the Watergate scandal and that he must assume the presidency.
2	"Voices Carry"	Susanne Bier	Aaron Cooley & Cathy Schulman and Ellen Fairey and Abby Ajayi	April 24, 2022	0.224
In 1974, Betty watches Nixon's resignation speech on television. Gerald is sworn in as president. In 2007, Hillary Clinton's 2008 presidential campaign gains momentum in the polls. Barack asks his wife, Michelle, to help him secure the Democratic nomination for the 2008 presidential election. Michelle delivers several speeches in support of his campaign. However, after she says that for the first time in her adult lifetime she is really proud of her country, the media and critics portray her as an Angry black woman. She later tells the media that she is proud of her husband's presidential campaign. During the Great Depression, Eleanor meets an unemployed man waiting in line at a soup kitchen and begins redecorating the White House. FDR delivers his inaugural address. In 2009, Michelle becomes first lady and tries on her inaugural gown. She replaces Susan Sher as her chief of staff after Gwen. In 1974, the Fords move into the White House, and Betty begins her first day as first lady. She plans the Fords' first state dinner for King Hussein of Jordan and his wife, Alia Toukan, but her secretary cancels it. Nancy Howe tells Betty not to cancel the event, and Gerald instructs his secretary to reinstate it. The Fords ultimately host their first state dinner at the White House.
3	"Please Allow Me"	Susanne Bier	Teleplay by : Jennifer Westfeldt & Hunt Baldwin and Aaron Cooley and Yolonda E. Lawrence; Story by : Jennifer Westfeldt & Hunt Baldwin and Yolonda E. Lawrence and Zora Bikangagan	May 1, 2022	0.202
In 1947, a young Betty Bloomer Warren works part-time as a dance instructor for young girls while caring for her abusive, comatose husband, Bill Warren. At work, she meets a young lawyer, Gerald Ford. During a dinner together, Gerald encourages Betty to file for divorce because of Bill's abuse. In 1987, a young Michelle Robinson returns home from Harvard Law School to visit her parents and notices her father's mounting medical bills. In 1989, she begins working at the Sidley Austin law firm in Chicago, where she meets a young biracial attorney, Barack Obama. The two later begin dating. In 1900, a young Eleanor Roosevelt is sent to Allenswood School for Girls in London. Betty later works at a fashion store and asks Bill to sign the divorce papers. She moves into her own apartment and asks Gerald to spend time with her, but he is preoccupied with his legal work. Disappointed by his lack of attention, Betty distances herself from him until he apologizes, and they begin dating. In 1991, Michelle takes her father, Fraser Robinson III, to the hospital. Frustrated by the long wait, she becomes worried, and Barack comforts her. In 1902, Eleanor attends her White House debut, where she meets her uncle Theodore Roosevelt and her fifth cousin, a young Franklin Roosevelt, who asks her to dance, but she declines. Later in 1991, Michelle invites Barack to her family's Thanksgiving dinner, where he asks her mother, Marian Robinson, for permission to marry her daughter. The episode concludes with a montage of Eleanor, Betty, and Michelle marrying Franklin, Gerald, and Barack, respectively.
4	"Cracked Pot"	Susanne Bier	Teleplay by : Jennifer Westfeldt & Hunt Baldwin and Ellen Fairey and Cathy Schulman & Aaron Cooley; Story by : Cathy Schulman & Aaron Cooley and Zora Bikangaga	May 8, 2022	0.185
In 1918, at the Roosevelts' home in New York City, Eleanor discovers letters revealing that her husband is having an affair with his secretary, Lucy Mercer. Devastated, she offers Franklin a divorce, but Sara Roosevelt insists that they remain married, and Franklin agrees to end contact with Lucy. In 2001, at the Obamas' home in Chicago, Barack and Michelle discover that their three-month-old daughter, Sasha, has bacterial meningitis. In January 1919, during World War I, the Roosevelts return from France and are reunited with their children and Sara after safely leaving the war-torn country. In 1964, at the Fords' home in Alexandria, Virginia, Betty experiences severe pain in her left shoulder. Her doctor prescribes medication, but taking it where alcohol is served adversely affects her. Betty reveals that she had dreamed of becoming a dancer. In flashbacks, it is reveled she had studied at a dance studio in New York and was taught by Martha Graham. In 2001, Sasha recovers from her illness, and Michelle accepts a hospital position helping communities on Chicago's South Side. In 1929, after women gain the right to vote and run for office, Eleanor attends a meeting in Greenwich Village as a member of the League of Women Voters, where she meets Lorena Hickok. The two quickly form a friendship. In 1964, Betty's doctor prescribes sleeping pills, which she takes while continuing to drink alcohol. Having begun drinking as a teenager, Betty's addiction strains her relationship with her children and nearly causes her to lose Susan. Gerald helps her confront her addiction, and Betty apologizes to their children. Ashamed of her behavior, she reflects on her disappointment over leaving Martha Graham's dance company.
5	"See Saw"	Susanne Bier	Teleplay by : Ellen Fairey and Azia Squire and Zora Bikangaga; Story by : Azia Squire	May 15, 2022	0.226
In 1974, Gerald delivers a statement announcing the pardon of Richard Nixon. As Betty and Susan watch it on television, Betty is dismayed by the public's angry reaction to the pardon, believing it is necessary for the country to move past Nixon and the Watergate scandal. In 1948, a young Betty is surprised to learn that Gerald is running for Congress. He apologizes for not telling her and promises to keep no more secrets. In 2010, Barack Obama signs the Healthy, Hunger-Free Kids Act of 2010 as part of Michelle Obama's Let's Move! initiative to combat childhood obesity and hunger. Michelle visits a school, where she meets a girl named Sylvie, who takes an extra healthy meal home for her mother. Michelle sympathizes with her and gives her another meal. The Obamas face criticism from Republicans over healthier school meals and the Affordable Care Act, while conservative support grows ahead of the 2010 midterm elections. In 1933, Eleanor Roosevelt receives positive newspaper coverage from Hick, while Louis Howe shows her negative articles and political cartoons criticizing her. Eleanor responds to the criticism in a radio address. She later meets with Steve Early to discuss her idea for an all-female White House press conference to promote employment opportunities for women journalists. In 1974, at Bethesda Naval Hospital in Maryland, Nancy accompanies Betty for emotional support during her mammogram and encourages her to undergo one as well. Betty's mammogram reveals that she has breast cancer, and she undergoes a mastectomy. In 2010, Democrats suffer major losses in the midterm elections, disappointing the Obamas. The Obamas later celebrate the passage of the legislation. In 1933, Eleanor holds her first all-female press conference and hosts a reception afterward. In 1974, Betty recovers from her mastectomy and is greeted by her family, hospital staff, and well-wishers as American women express their support for her. Later, the Fords read letters from women across the country expressing their support following Betty's breast cancer diagnosis. After reading them, Betty looks at her mastectomy scars, and Gerald comforts her by reassuring her that she is beautiful.
6	"Shout Out"	Susanne Bier	Nikole Beckwith and Alyson Feltes and Abby Ajayi	May 22, 2022	0.185
In 1933, at the Mayflower Hotel, Eleanor and Hick spend the night together before Eleanor leaves for work. They share a goodbye kiss. In 2012, during the 2012 presidential election, Michelle Obama is asked by LGBTQ+ Americans whether her husband will support marriage equality. She responds that he will protect the rights of LGBTQ+ families. At dinner, the Obamas' daughters tell their parents that the Defense of Marriage Act is unfair. Barack asks that they avoid discussing politics at the dinner table but says he understands their frustration. After dinner, Michelle and Barack discuss the possibility of supporting same-sex marriage, even if it costs him the election. In 1933, Eleanor tries to hide Hick's robes, but a housekeeper discovers them. Her daughter Anna begins working with her, while Sara Roosevelt asks Eleanor about her plans at the White House. Eleanor later goes camping with Hick, and the two begin a romantic relationship. In 1974, Betty is praised by American women for her openness about undergoing a mastectomy, and Time names her among its People of the Year for 1975. She and her staff work to promote the Equal Rights Amendment and women's rights, drawing the disapproval of Gerald's chief of staff, Dick Cheney, and Secretary of Defense Donald Rumsfeld. After Patty Hearst is kidnapped by the Symbionese Liberation Army, Susan goes shopping for her prom dress without her Secret Service agents, Austin and Keiser, worrying Gerald. Concerned for her safety, Gerald tells Susan that she will be withdrawn from school, angering her because of her upcoming senior prom. Betty discusses the decision with Susan, who suggests holding her prom in the East Room of the White House. In 2012, the Obamas watch Vice President Joe Biden express his support for same-sex marriage on television. In 1974, Rumsfeld and Cheney tell Gerald that they oppose Betty's support for the ERA and women's rights. Gerald replies that he supports his wife's advocacy. Betty later asks him to allow Susan to hold her prom at the White House. In 1933, FDR offers Anna a position working with him. He also receives photographs from J. Edgar Hoover that appear to show a romantic relationship between Eleanor and Hick. Louis Howe tells Eleanor that Hick has resigned as a White House correspondent before collapsing and dying in his office. In 1974, the Fords agree to let Susan hold her prom at the White House, while Betty tells her ERA team to end its work. In 2012, North Carolina bans same-sex marriage. In 1933, the Roosevelts discuss Hick's resignation. Eleanor suggests that Hick return to write about the New Deal programs, and FDR shows her Hoover's photographs. Eleanor tells Franklin that she loves him, not Hick romantically, and he agrees to rehire Hick. In 2012, Barack is interviewed by Robin Roberts on ABC's Good Morning America, where he announces his support for same-sex marriage. Same-sex marriage is later legalized nationwide in 2015 following Obergefell v. Hodges.
7	"Nadir"	Susanne Bier	Teleplay by : Nicole Jefferson Asher and Ellen Fairey and Zora Bikangaga; Story by : Nicole Jefferson Asher	May 29, 2022	0.202
In 1975, on Christmas Eve, Dick Cheney and Donald Rumsfeld call Gerald Ford to discuss campaign matters with him and Betty Ford. On Christmas Day, Cheney and Rumsfeld show the Fords a Saturday Night Live sketch featuring Chevy Chase portraying Ford. They warn that Ronald Reagan could win the Republican nomination in the 1976 election and urge Betty to encourage women to vote Republican. Nancy Reagan later calls the Fords to tell them that her husband has died by suicide. In 2012, following the Sandy Hook Elementary School shooting, Barack and Michelle Obama pick up their daughters early from school. Barack is heartbroken because the victims were elementary school children younger than Sasha. He delivers an emotional statement about the shooting, after which he and Michelle embrace their daughters. In 1975, Betty and Susan Ford attend the funeral of Nancy's husband, after which Nancy resigns from her job. In a 1934 flashback, a young Betty is told by her mother that her father died by suicide. Back in 1976, Betty watches Nancy Reagan on television and disapproves of her views. The Fords attend the Republican National Convention, where Gerald Ford secures the Republican presidential nomination. In 1939, Eleanor Roosevelt holds a press conference on civil rights and racial segregation. She calls Mary McLeod Bethune ("Hick") to discuss discrimination in the United States and tells her that they are best friends. Eleanor is recognized as a national hero for her support of the civil rights movement and arranges for Marian Anderson to perform after the Daughters of the American Revolution refused to host her. In 2012, Barack Obama wins reelection to a second term. His daughters and their grandmother watch footage of Marian Anderson's 1939 performance on YouTube, and Marian tells them about Eleanor Roosevelt. In 2013, Obama is inaugurated for a second term, and the Obamas meet a group of girls from Chicago's South Side who perform at the inauguration and are thrilled to meet Michelle. A week later, Tina Tchen informs Michelle that Hadiya Pendleton, one of the girls who performed at the inauguration, has been shot and killed. Michelle and her mother, Marian Robinson, are devastated. Michelle attends Pendleton's funeral and afterward discusses gun control with the mayor of Chicago. Back at the White House, she tells Barack about the funeral and their conversation on gun violence. In 1939, Eleanor Roosevelt records a radio address supporting civil rights and visits the Tuskegee Institute in Alabama. Franklin D. Roosevelt explains that although he wants to end segregation, doing so would cost him the support of Southern Democrats. In 1976, Betty speaks at Buffalo City Hall in support of her husband's campaign. Before taking the stage, she takes medication that affects her during the speech, leaving her visibly unwell.
8	"Punch Perfect"	Susanne Bier	Nikole Beckwith and Ellen Fairey and Abby Ajayi	June 5, 2022	0.287
In 2015, the Obamas host a Democratic National Committee fundraiser in Washington, D.C.. In 1976, on election night, the Fords and their staff watch the election returns on television. Jimmy Carter wins the election, and Gerald delivers a concession speech congratulating Carter on his victory. Before leaving office, Betty asks the White House photographer to take final photographs of her, including pictures of her dancing and sitting atop the table in the Cabinet Room. In 1940, during World War II, Jewish refugees fleeing Nazi Germany ask FDR for help, but he is unable to intervene because of the conflict in Europe. Eleanor records a radio address urging support for Jewish refugees. Later, Eleanor and Hick discuss the Jewish refugees aboard the SS Quanza. At a dinner gathering, Eleanor urges the guests to help the refugees, while Anna criticizes her father for not doing more. The Roosevelts then receive word that Sara Roosevelt is dying in Hyde Park, New York. Eleanor and Anna are with her as she shares her final words before dying. In 2015, Malia Obama urges Michelle to continue advocating for gun control following the deaths of African Americans, including Trayvon Martin, Tamir Rice, and others. Michelle is later invited by Tuskegee University to deliver its commencement address. In 1982, a young Michelle discusses her grades, extracurricular activities, and community service with her high school guidance counselor in hopes of attending Princeton University. The counselor instead suggests that she consider other schools, leaving Michelle discouraged. Her mother encourages her to ignore the advice and pursue her goal. In 2015, Michelle delivers a commencement address at Tuskegee, encouraging the graduating class to persevere despite the challenges of being Black in America. Her speech is broadcast live on television. In 1978, after leaving office, the Fords move to Palm Springs, California. Betty attends a neighbor's party, returns home with a hangover, and collapses on the floor of her bedroom.
9	"Rift"	Susanne Bier	Teleplay by : Jennifer Westfeldt and Aaron Cooley & Cathy Schulman and Abby Ajayi; Story by : Jennifer Westfeldt and Cathy Schulman & Aaron Cooley	June 12, 2022	0.292
In 1978, Susan finds Betty collapsed on the floor and discovers that she has accumulated a large number of pills in her room. She tells Gerald that Betty has been abusing alcohol and prescription drugs, but Betty denies it. In 1941, following the Attack on Pearl Harbor, Eleanor delivers a radio address responding to the attack and outlining her plans to support the war effort. FDR discusses with her the United States' role in World War II. In 2016, Hillary Clinton runs against Donald Trump in the 2016 presidential election. The Obamas' daughters express excitement about the possibility of Hillary becoming the first female president of the United States, and Michelle is asked to campaign for her. In 1978, Susan asks Dr. Crue to help Betty confront her addiction to alcohol and prescription drugs. Betty rejects the intervention and orders both him and Susan to leave. Gerald then realizes that Susan has been right about Betty's substance abuse. In 1943, Hick overhears Eleanor and several women enjoying each other's company and concludes that Eleanor no longer needs her. Hurt by what she hears, Hick leaves despite Eleanor's attempts to stop her. In 2016, Hillary apologizes to Michelle for her criticism of Barack during the 2008 Democratic presidential primary and asks for her support. Michelle agrees and campaigns for Hillary, delivering a speech encouraging women to vote for her. In 1978, the Fords, their children, and the family's longtime nanny, Clara, stage an intervention for Betty and urge her to enter a rehabilitation center for her substance use disorder. Although Betty initially refuses because of her status as a former first lady, she ultimately agrees and begins treatment. Later in 2016, the Obamas watch the election returns on television. Donald Trump wins the election, devastating their daughters, who fear that he will repeal the Affordable Care Act.
10	"Victory Dance"	Susanne Bier	Teleplay by : Nikole Beckwith and Ellen Fairey and Abby Ajayi; Story by : Aaron Cooley	June 19, 2022	0.220
In 2017, during Barack Obama's final week as president, the Obamas begin packing their belongings before leaving the White House. In 1945, after FDR wins the 1944 presidential election, he delivers a post-election address. Eleanor notices that he appears physically weakened, and Anna reveals that a Navy cardiologist has diagnosed him with heart failure. Concerned about her husband's health, Eleanor asks Anna for her help. In 1978, at a rehabilitation center in Long Beach, California, Betty struggles with painful memories and fears that she will never recover from her addiction. With the support of her fellow patients and staff, she begins to heal. In 1945, as World War II nears its end, FDR returns to the United States and retires to Warm Springs, Georgia. After his death, Eleanor and Anna bid him a final farewell. In 2017, Sasha grows tired of Malia's constant attention to news about Donald Trump. White House staff member Allen informs the Obamas that Malia has created a Facebook account and spent the previous day posting critical comments about Trump. Barack asks that the account be taken down. Michelle encourages Malia to channel her anger constructively, and Malia apologizes for creating the account. Michelle later reads the farewell letter left by Betty Ford for the incoming first lady and reflects on its message. In 1978, after six months in rehabilitation, Betty is reunited with her family and returns home sober. In 1981, Betty begins planning the Betty Ford Center to help people struggling with substance use disorders. In 2017, on Barack's final day in office, the Obama family bids farewell to the White House staff and thanks them for their eight years of service. In 2019, Michelle discusses her memoir, Becoming, at an event in Chicago. While signing books, she reunites with Cindy Boudreaux, who had originally been assigned as her roommate at Princeton University before a room change was requested by Boudreaux's mother because Michelle was Black. Michelle forgives Cindy, and the two reconcile. She later meets a 13-year-old admirer named Zoe and signs her book. In 1945, following FDR's funeral, Eleanor moves to Val-Kill Cottage, where her secretary, Malvina Thompson, asks to remain with her. In 1981, construction of the Betty Ford Center begins. Anna invites Eleanor to live with her, but Eleanor encourages her daughter to be independent while promising they will remain close. Harry S. Truman is sworn in as president, and the United Nations is established. Truman asks Eleanor to serve as the United States delegate to the United Nations General Assembly, and she accepts. In 1948, she addresses the General Assembly in Paris. In 1991, Betty is awarded the Presidential Medal of Freedom by President George H. W. Bush. In 2019, Michelle speaks at a public high school and answers students' questions. The episode concludes with a montage of Eleanor, Betty, and Michelle delivering speeches after leaving the White House and reflecting on their legacies.

== Production ==
=== Development ===
On February 5, 2020, it was announced that Showtime had given the production, then known as First Ladies, a series order. Executive producers were expected to include Viola Davis, Julius Tennon, Cathy Schulman, Jeff Gaspin, Brad Kaplan, and Aaron Cooley, who also created the series and will write. Davis would star as Michelle Obama. In January 2021, Michelle Pfeiffer, Jayme Lawson, and Kristine Froseth joined the cast of the series as Betty Ford, young Obama, and young Ford, respectively, with Susanne Bier set to direct and executive produce. That same month, Pamela Adlon and Rhys Wakefield joined the cast.

On February 16, 2021, Aaron Eckhart joined the cast as President Gerald Ford. That same month, Judy Greer replaced Adlon due to scheduling conflicts. On February 22, 2021, it was announced that Gillian Anderson would portray Eleanor Roosevelt. Three days later, on February 25, 2021, it was announced that O. T. Fagbenle would portray President Barack Obama. Dakota Fanning was announced to have joined the cast as Susan Ford on March 2, 2021. On March 9, 2021, Lexi Underwood joined the cast as Malia Obama in a recurring role.

On March 10, 2021, nine more joined the cast, including Derek Cecil as Donald Rumsfeld, Aya Cash as Esther Liebowitz, Jake Picking as Gerald Ford (young), Cayden Boyd as Michael Ford, Marc Hills as Jack Ford, Ben Cook as Steven Ford, Leslie Kritzer as Martha Graham, Thomas E. Sullivan as Bill Warren, and Patrice Johnson Chevannes as Clara Powell.

On April 13, 2021, Regina Taylor joined the cast in a series regular role as Marian Shields Robinson, while Saniyya Sidney, Julian De Niro and Evan Parke joined the cast in recurring roles as Sasha Obama, young Barack Obama and SS Allen Taylor, respectively. In June 2021, Gloria Reuben and Kate Mulgrew joined the cast as Valerie June Jarrett and Susan Sher, while Rosalind Chao, Michael Potts, Kathleen Garrett and Donna Lynne Champlin joined in recurring capacities.

In July 2021, Kiefer Sutherland and Lily Rabe joined the main cast as Franklin D. Roosevelt and Lorena Hickok, respectively, while Ellen Burstyn, Eliza Scanlen, Cailee Spaeny, Clea DuVall and Charlie Plummer joined the cast in recurring roles. In August 2021, Jackie Earle Haley, Maria Dizzia, and Jeremy Bobb were cast in recurring capacities. The series premiered on April 17, 2022, on Showtime and Paramount+ Internationally in 2022. On August 1, 2022, Showtime canceled the series after one season.

=== Filming ===
On February 25, 2021, it was announced that filming had begun in Covington, Georgia.

== Reception ==
=== Critical response ===
The review aggregator website Rotten Tomatoes reported a 41% approval rating with an average rating of 6.00/10, based on 44 critic reviews. The website's critics consensus reads, "Despite formidable stars and a rich history to draw from, a lack of focus and shallow characterization make The First Lady second-rate television." Metacritic, which uses a weighted average, assigned a score of 50 out of 100 based on 22 critics, indicating "mixed or average reviews".

=== Accolades ===
Year	Award	Category	Nominee(s)	Result	Ref.
2022	Black Reel Television Awards	Outstanding Actress, TV Movie or Limited Series	Viola Davis	Nominated	
2022	Hollywood Critics Association TV Awards	Best Actress in a Broadcast Network or Cable Limited or Anthology Series	Michelle Pfeiffer	Nominated	
2022	Hollywood Critics Association TV Awards	Best Writing in a Broadcast Network or Cable Limited or Anthology Series	Aaron Cooley, Cathy Schulman, Ellen Fairey, and Abby Ajayi (for "Voices Carry")	Nominated	
2022	Primetime Emmy Awards	Outstanding Period Costumes	Signe Sejlund, Felicia Jarvis, Matthew Hemesath, Paula Truman, Stephen Oh, and Jessica Trejos (for "Cracked Pot")	Nominated	
2022	Primetime Emmy Awards	Outstanding Period and/or Character Hairstyling	Colleen LaBaff, Louisa Anthony, Lawrence Davis, Julie Kendrick, Robert Wilson, Jamika Wilson, Evelyn Roach, and Jaime Leigh McIntosh (for "See Saw")	Nominated	
2022	Primetime Emmy Awards	Outstanding Period and/or Character Makeup (Non-Prosthetic)	Carol Rasheed, Sergio López-Rivera, Valli O'Reilly, Chauntelle Langston, and Milene Melendez (for "Cracked Pot")	Nominated	
2023	Critics' Choice Awards	Best Actress in a Limited Series or Movie Made for Television	Michelle Pfeiffer	Nominated	
2023	NAACP Image Awards	Outstanding Actress in a Television Movie, Mini-Series or Dramatic Special	Viola Davis	Nominated	

=== Ratings ===
Viewership and ratings per episode of The First Lady
No.	Title	Air date	Rating (18–49)	Viewers (millions)
1	"That White House"	April 17, 2022	0.01	0.263
2	"Voices Carry"	April 24, 2022	0.02	0.224
3	"Please Allow Me"	May 1, 2022	0.03	0.202
4	"Cracked Pot"	May 8, 2022	0.02	0.185
5	"See Saw"	May 15, 2022	0.04	0.226
6	"Shout Out"	May 22, 2022	0.02	0.185
7	"Nadir"	May 29, 2022	0.01	0.202
8	"Punch Perfect"	June 5, 2022	0.04	0.287
9	"Rift"	June 12, 2022	0.03	0.292
10	"Victory Dance"	June 19, 2022	0.01	0.220
