= Edward Field (poet) =

American poet and author (1924–2026)

- Born: June 7, 1924; New York City, U.S.
- Died: September 6, 2026 (aged 102); New York City, U.S.
- Other name: Bruce Elliot (pseudonym with Neil Derrick)
- Occupations: Poet; novelist; editor
- Spouse: Neil Derrick (m. 2017; died 2018)
- Awards: Lamont Poetry Prize (Academy of American Poets)
- Military career
- Allegiance: United States
- Branch: United States Army Air Forces
- Rank: Officer
- Unit: 8th Air Force
- Conflicts: World War II
- Website: www.edwardfield.com

Edward Field (June 7, 1924 – September 6, 2026) was an American poet, novelist, memoirist and anthologist.

== Life and career ==
=== Background ===
Field was born in Brooklyn, New York City, on June 7, 1924, to a family of Ashkenazi Jewish immigrants. He grew up in Lynbrook, New York, and, being Jewish, he and his family faced antisemitism and discrimination. He played cello in the "Field Family Trio" with his sisters Adele on violin and Alice on piano, which had a weekly radio program on WGBB in Freeport.

He served in World War II with the Eighth Air Force in England and France as a navigator in heavy bombers, flying 27 missions over Germany. In February 1945, he took part in a raid on Berlin. His B-17 was crippled by flak and crash-landed in the North Sea. All ten crew members reached the life rafts, but only seven survived until rescued by a British air-sea vessel hours later. Field survived when ball turret gunner Jack Cook gave up his place on the raft for Field. The animated short film Minor Accident of War is about that event.

In 1959, Field met Neil Derrick. As Field later recalled: "I was working in the typing pool of an advertising agency, and the supervisor assigned the typewriter next to me to a new temp, a terrific-looking young man from California named Neil Derrick. It was a case of immediate attraction between WASP and Jew." In 1972, the couple moved to the nonprofit artists' housing Westbeth Artists Community in New York City's West Village. They married in 2017. Derrick died on January 5, 2018. Field continued to reside at Westbeth and was regarded as one of the complex's notable residents.

Field turned 100 on June 7, 2024; Publishers Weekly called him "irreplaceable in the history of gay American writing". He died in New York City on September 6, 2026, at the age of 102.

=== Career ===
Field began writing poetry during World War II, after a Red Cross worker gave him an anthology of poetry. His 1963 debut, Stand Up, Friend, With Me, won the Lamont Poetry Prize and was published by Grove Press. William Carlos Williams called it "clean, straight writing that knows what a poem could be made of", and judge Mark Van Doren praised it as "one of the best I have read in years". In 1963, Field received a Guggenheim Fellowship.

In 1966, a film for which Field wrote the narration, To Be Alive!, won an Academy Award in that category.

In 1978, Field and his partner Neil Derrick (1931–2018), began publishing novels under the pseudonym "Bruce Elliot". Their first was The Potency Clinic. Their historical novel Village, set in 1845 Greenwich Village, became a bestseller and included cameo appearances by Walt Whitman, Henry James, Mabel Dodge, Edna St. Vincent Millay, and others. It was later revised and reissued as The Villagers.

In 1979, Field edited the anthology A Geography of Poets. He later co-edited A New Geography of Poets (1992) with Gerald Locklin and Charles Stetler.

In 1992, Field received a Lambda Literary Award for Counting Myself Lucky: Selected Poems 1963–1992.

In 2003, editor Harvey Shapiro included Field's poem "World War II" in the Poets of World War II anthology (Library of America).

In 2005, Field received the Bill Whitehead Award for Lifetime Achievement from Publishing Triangle. That same year, the University of Wisconsin Press published his memoir The Man Who Would Marry Susan Sontag and Other Intimate Literary Portraits of the Bohemian Era, which dealt largely with the writer Alfred Chester. Publishers Weekly described the book as "very charming" and "of serious interest to anyone intrigued by New York literary life of the 1950s and '60s".

Publishers Weekly's review of Field's next collection, After the Fall: Poems Old and New (2007, University of Pittsburgh Press), said, "At his best Field is direct, likable, modest, charming, a storyteller. ... At less than his best, Field’s unadorned style can make him sound predictable ...." The Brooklyn Rail called it "accessible and urgent", while Booklist wrote that Field's new poems, written after 9/11, may be "the best 9/11 protest poems yet".

In 2011, British editor Diana Athill published Instead of a Book: Letters to a Friend (Granta Books), a collection of her correspondence with Field spanning more than thirty years.

In 2019, Field's niece Diane Weis produced the animated short Minor Accident of War, inspired by his wartime experiences. The film, designed by Piotr Kabat, features Field narrating his poem "World War II".

In 2025, his niece along with Keri Cameron and Aaron Lubarksy, produced a documentary about Field's life called Field Trip which was directed by Hannah Rafkin. The documentary is due to screen at film festivals in late 2026.

Throughout his career, Field gave readings at the Library of Congress and the 92NY's Unterberg Poetry Center, and taught workshops there as well as at Sarah Lawrence College and Hofstra University. He also edited The Alfred Chester Society Newsletter.

== Books ==
=== Poetry ===
- Stand Up, Friend, With Me (Grove Press, 1963)
- Variety Photoplays (Grove Press, 1967)
- A Full Heart (Sheep Meadow Press, 1977)
- Stars in My Eyes (Sheep Meadow Press, 1978)
- New and Selected Poems: From the Book of My Life (Sheep Meadow Press, 1987)
- Counting Myself Lucky: Selected Poems 1963–1992 (Black Sparrow Press, 1992)
- A Frieze for a Temple of Love (Black Sparrow Press, 1998)
- After The Fall: Poems Old and New (University of Pittsburgh Press, 2007)

=== Chapbooks ===
- Icarus (1963)
- The Lost, Dancing (Watershed Tapes, 1984)
- A Journey (illustrated by Jan Jutte) (Jack's Brook, 2007)

=== Fiction (written with Neil Derrick under the pseudonym Bruce Elliot) ===
- The Potency Clinic (Bleecker Street Press, 1978)
- Die PotenzKlinik (Berlin: Albino Verlag, 1982)
- Village (Avon Books, 1982)
- The Office (Ballantine Books, 1987)
- The Villagers (Painted Leaf Press, 2000) (*A revised edition of Village)

=== Nonfiction ===
- The Man Who Would Marry Susan Sontag, and Other Intimate Literary Portraits of the Bohemian Era (University of Wisconsin Press, 2006, paperback edition, 2007)
- Kabuli Days: Travels in Old Afghanistan (World Parade Books, 2008)

=== As Editor ===
- A Geography of Poets (editor) (Bantam Books, 1979)
- Head of a Sad Angel: Stories by Alfred Chester (editor) (Black Sparrow Press, 1990). Introduction by Gore Vidal.
- Looking For Genet: Essays by Alfred Chester (editor) (Black Sparrow Press, 1992)
- A New Geography of Poets (editor, with Gerald Locklin and Charles Stetler) (University of Arkansas Press, 1992)
- Dancing with a Tiger: Selected Poems by Robert Friend (editor) (Spuyten Duyvil, 2003)
- Voyage to Destruction: The Moroccan Letters of Alfred Chester (editor) (Spuyten Duyvil, 2022)

=== Young Readers ===
- Eskimo Songs and Stories (Delacorte Press, 1973)
- Magic Words (Harcourt Brace, 1998)

== Periodicals ==
Field's poetry and essays have appeared in, among others, The New Yorker, The New York Review of Books, Gay & Lesbian Review, Partisan Review, The Nation, Evergreen Review, The New York Times Book Review, Michigan Quarterly Review, Raritan Quarterly Review, Parnassus, and The Kenyon Review.

== Awards and honors ==
- Lamont Poetry Prize (Academy of American Poets), 1962
- Guggenheim Fellowship, 1963
- Shelley Memorial Award (Poetry Society of America), 1975
- Fellow of the American Academy in Rome, 1982
- Lambda Literary Award, 1993
- Bill Whitehead Lifetime Achievement Award (Publishing Triangle), 2005
- W. H. Auden Prize
