= Ethan McSweeny =

American theatre director

- Born: Washington, D.C., United States
- Education: Columbia University (BA)
- Occupation(s): Director, Artistic Director
- Employer: American Shakespeare Center
- Spouse: Nancy Anderson
- Relatives: Terrell McSweeny (sister)

Ethan McSweeny is an American theatre director. He served as artistic director of the American Shakespeare Center from 2018 to 2021.

== Early life and education ==
McSweeny is a native of Washington, D.C., the son of political journalists Dorothy and William F. McSweeney, who served as Lyndon B. Johnson's deputy chief of staff and later an executive vice president of Occidental Petroleum, heading its international division. His mother served as chairwoman of the DC Commission on the Arts and Humanities and the Mid Atlantic Arts Foundation. His siblings include former Federal Trade Commission Commissioner Terrell McSweeny.

McSweeny graduated from St. Albans School and received his B.A. from Columbia University in 1993 as the first graduate of the theater and dramatic art major of Columbia College. At Columbia, he studied theatre under Austin E. Quigley and directed two student productions, Look Back in Anger and The Tempest.

== Career ==
McSweeny returned to Washington after college and spent four years working as assistant director of The Shakespeare Theatre under Michael Kahn. In 1997, he landed his first engagement as a director of John Logan's Never the Sinner at the Signature Theatre in Arlington County, Virginia, then at Rep Stage in Howard County, Maryland, American Jewish Theatre, and the John Houseman Theatre in New York City. He has also worked as a freelance director at the Guthrie Theater, Old Globe Theatre, Studio Theatre, and The Alley Theater and was hailed as a "wunderkind" by American Theatre magazine in 2006. His Broadway credits included The Best Man and A Time To Kill.

McSweeney joined the American Shakespeare Center as artistic director in 2018, succeeding Jim Warren, who co-founded ASC and stepped down at the end of 2017. He previously co-directed Chautauqua Theater Company in Upstate New York for eight years with Vivienne Benesch. He won a Helen Hayes Award in 2018 for Outstanding direction in a play.

McSweeney stepped down in 2021 amidst budget cuts and complaints about the workplace climate from former employees.

== Personal life ==
McSweeney is married to stage actor Nancy Anderson, who received multiple Drama Desk Award, Laurence Olivier Award, and Helen Hayes Award nominations.
