= Beka Economopoulos =

American artist and activist (born 1974)

- Born: 1974 (age 51–52)
- Education: Northwestern University
- Known for: Social justice activism
- Website: notanalternative.org/ and http://thenaturalhistorymuseum.org

Beka Economopoulos (born 1974) is an American artist and director of the art, activism, technology, and theory non-profit "Not An Alternative". She is a co-founder and director of a traveling pop-up museum, The Natural History Museum, as well as an organizer of the March for Science.

== Personal life ==
Economopoulos was educated at Holton-Arms School and Northwestern University. She is married to Jason Jones. They have one child, and they live in Vashon, Washington.

== Career ==
An environmental justice activist since about 1993, Economopoulos was a co-founder of The Natural History Museum in 2014, a traveling museum and museum transformation project highlighting sociopolitical forces that shape nature, which The New York Times and ArtNet named "Best in Art in 2015". She is a founding member of Not An Alternative, a social justice arts collective, and she was a co-organizer and Board Member of the March for Science in 2017. She is a sustainability advocate, and has been Director of Online Organizing at Greenpeace and the Director of Strategy at Fission Strategy. In those positions she worked with the Global Climate Change Alliance and the United Nations Foundation.

Economopoulos and The Natural History museum have mobilized protests of museums with connections to petroleum interests and climate change deniers, urging museums to cut ties with them.

== Selected publications ==
- Sutton, Sarah W.; Wylie, Elizabeth; Economopoulos, Beka; O'Brien, Carter; Shapiro, Stephanie; Xu, Shengyin (June 19, 2017). "Museums and the Future of a Healthy World: "Just, Verdant and Peaceful"". Curator: The Museum Journal. 60 (2): 151–174. doi:10.1111/cura.12200. ISSN 0011-3069.
- Lyons, Steve; Economopoulos, Beka (May 7, 2015). "Museums must take a stand and cut ties to fossil fuels". The Guardian.
- Econopolis, Beka (December 15, 2015). "The Natural History Museum". New York.
- Economopoulos, Beka; Jones, Jason (April 12, 2016). "Not An Alternative -- Art, Art History & Visual Studies". aahvs.duke.edu. Duke University -- Art, Art History, and Visual Studies.
- Econopoulis, Beka. "Participationism (re: Re:Group: Beyond Models of Consensus) - Tactical Media Files". www.tacticalmediafiles.net.

== Awards ==
In 2018, Economopoulos became one of twenty Roddenberry fellows in the inaugural year of the fellowship, designated to support, "leaders and disrupters whose work is making our country more inclusive and equitable for all".
