= Terrell McSweeny =

American attorney

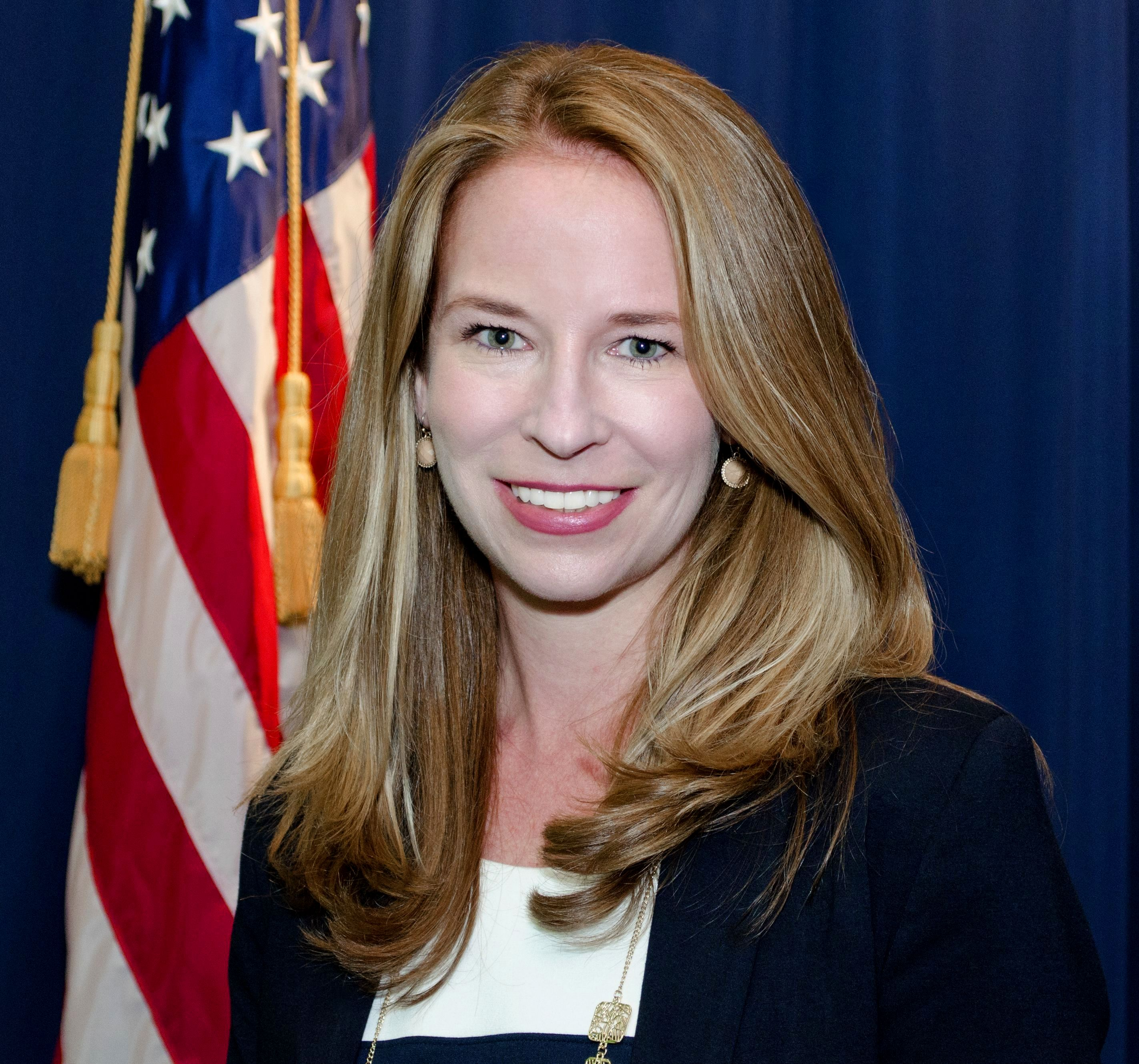

Commissioner of the Federal Trade Commission
- In office April 28, 2014 – April 27, 2018
- President: Barack Obama; Donald Trump
- Succeeded by: Joseph Simons

Personal details
- Party: Democratic
- Relations: Ethan McSweeny (brother)
- Education: Harvard University (BA); Georgetown University (JD)

Terrell McSweeny is an American attorney who served as a Commissioner of the Federal Trade Commission from 2014 until 2018.

== Personal life and education ==
McSweeny is a graduate of Holton-Arms School, Harvard University and Georgetown University Law Center. Her siblings include stage director Ethan McSweeny.

== Career ==
McSweeny formerly worked as an attorney at O'Melveny & Myers LLP. McSweeny's government service also includes her work as Senator Joe Biden's Deputy Chief of Staff and Policy Director in the U.S. Senate, where she managed domestic and economic policy development and legislative initiatives, and as Counsel on the United States Senate Committee on the Judiciary, where she worked on issues such as criminal justice, innovation, women's rights, domestic violence, judicial nominations, and immigration and civil rights.

Prior to joining the Commission, McSweeny served as Chief Counsel for Competition Policy and Intergovernmental Relations for the United States Department of Justice Antitrust Division. She joined the Antitrust Division after serving as Deputy Assistant to the President and Domestic Policy Advisor to the Vice President from January 2009 until February 2012, advising President Barack Obama and Vice President Joe Biden on policy in a variety of areas, including health care, innovation, intellectual property, energy, education, women's rights, criminal justice and domestic violence.

McSweeny was sworn in as a Commissioner of the FTC on April 28, 2014, to an initial term that expired on September 25, 2017. McSweeny left the position on April 28, 2018.

== See also ==
- List of former FTC commissioners
