= Susan Ford Bales =

American photographer

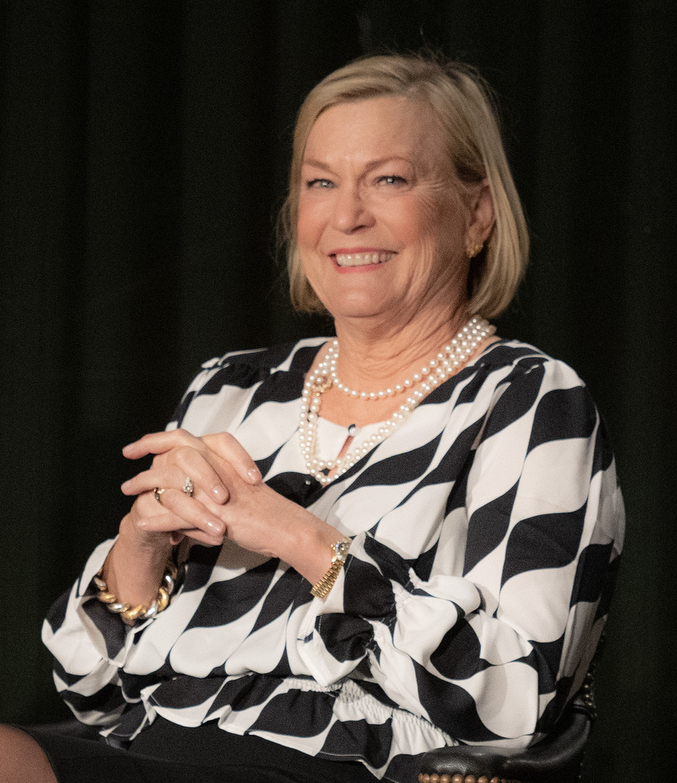
- Bales in 2023

2nd Chairwoman of the Betty Ford Center
- Incumbent
- Assumed office January 25, 2005
- Preceded by: Betty Ford

Personal details
- Born: Susan Elizabeth Ford; July 6, 1957 (age 69) Washington, D.C., U.S.
- Spouses: Charles Vance (m. 1979; div. 1988) Vaden Bales (m. 1989; div. 2018)
- Children: 2
- Parents: Gerald Ford; Betty Ford
- Relatives: Steven Ford (brother)
- Occupation: Author; photojournalist

Susan Elizabeth Ford Bales (née Ford; formerly Vance; born July 6, 1957) is an American author, photojournalist, and former chair of the board of the Betty Ford Center for alcohol and drug abuse. She is the only daughter of Gerald Ford, the 38th president of the United States, and his wife Betty Ford (née Bloomer).

== Biography ==
=== Youth ===
Ford is the youngest child, and only daughter, of former U.S. President Gerald Ford and former First Lady Betty Ford. As a teenager attending the Holton-Arms School in Bethesda, Maryland, she held her senior prom, for the class of 1975, in the East Room of the White House. She served as official White House hostess when her mother was hospitalized for breast cancer.

Ford enrolled in Mount Vernon College for Women (now part of the George Washington University) in northwest Washington, D.C., in 1975 when her father was in the White House. She later briefly attended the University of Kansas for the spring semester of 1977, but did not graduate.

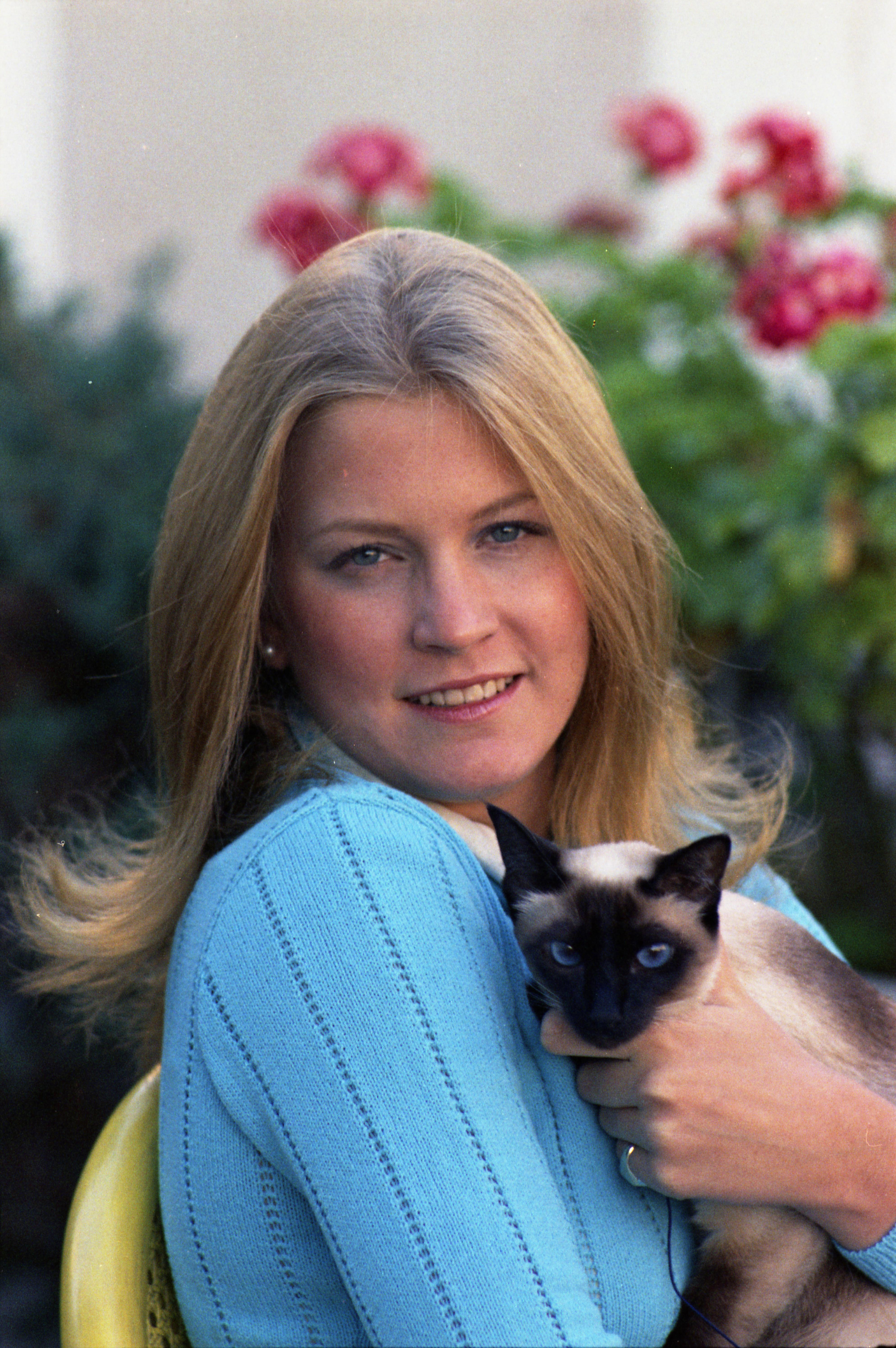
Ford and Siamese cat "Shan Shein" at the White House in 1974

=== Career ===
Bales trained as a photographer and worked as a photojournalist for the Associated Press, Newsweek, Money Magazine, Ladies Home Journal, The Topeka Capital-Journal, the Omaha Sun and also freelanced. She was hired to shoot publicity stills for the film Jaws 2, with many appearing in Ray Loynd's book Jaws 2 Log.

In 1992, she became a member of the board of the Betty Ford Center and in 2005 became chair of the organization. She succeeded her mother, who remained a board member.

=== Writings ===
In 2002, Bales wrote, with Laura Hayden, a novel, Double Exposure: A First Daughter Mystery, with a contemporary White House setting; in 2005, a sequel, Sharp Focus, was published.

=== Public events ===
Bales attended the December 26, 2006 – January 3, 2007 state funeral services and ceremonies for her father with her mother, and over the course of several days greeted mourners while President Ford's casket lay in state on the Lincoln catafalque in the Capitol Rotunda and during the public repose at the Gerald R. Ford Presidential Museum in Grand Rapids, Michigan. She read a passage from the Epistle of James during the funeral service at the Washington National Cathedral, and her daughter Tyne Berlanga offered one of the prayers during the funeral service at Grace Episcopal Church in Grand Rapids. In addition, on January 1, she assisted her mother in receiving dignitaries and official visitors who had come to Blair House, the presidential guest house in Washington, to pay their respects.

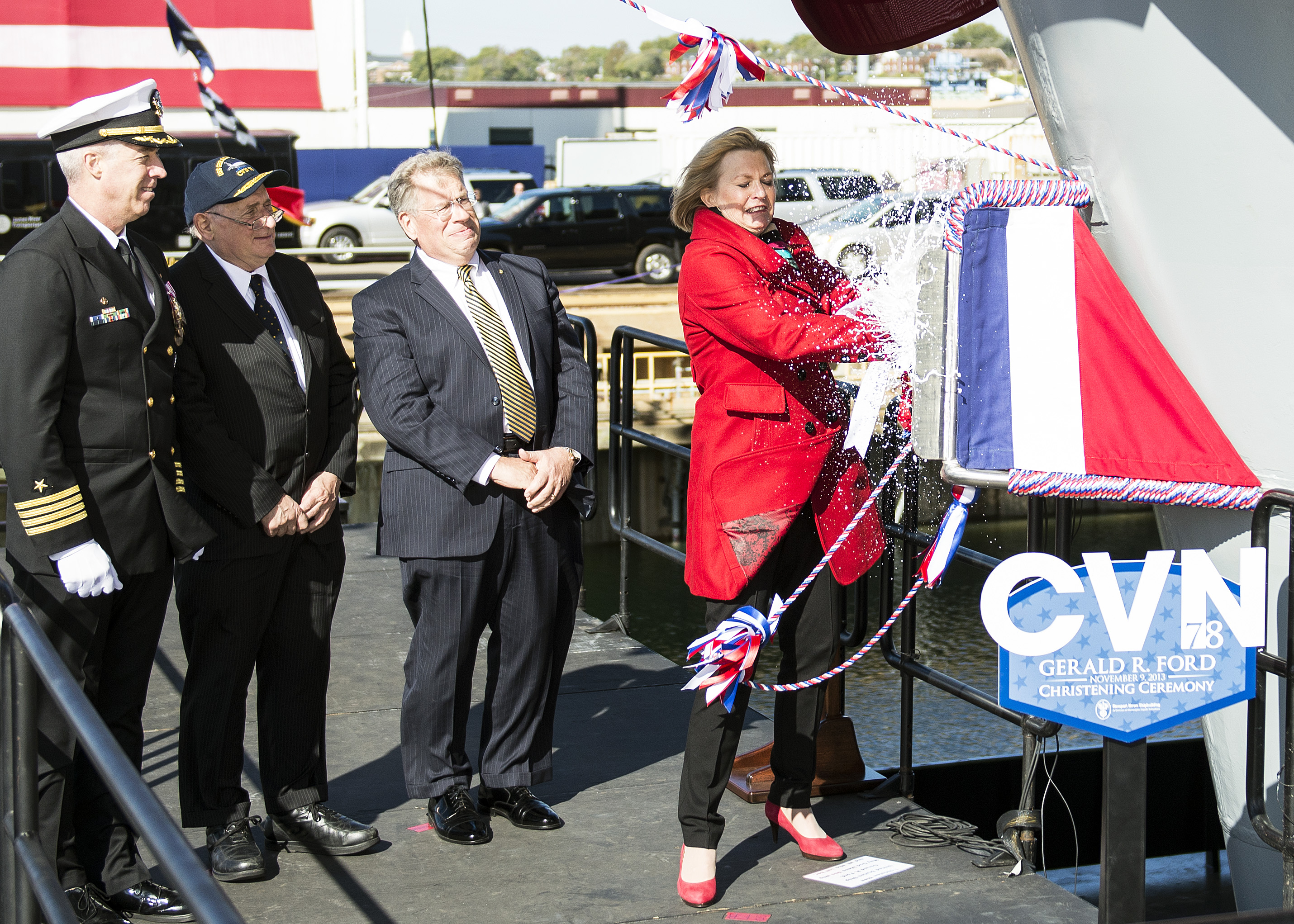
Bales christens Gerald R. Ford (CVN 78) in Newport News, Virginia on November 9, 2013

On January 16, 2007, Bales spoke at a naming ceremony at the Pentagon for the aircraft carrier CVN-78, which was officially named the Gerald R. Ford. That same day, Secretary of the Navy Donald Winter announced that Bales had been named the carrier's ceremonial sponsor. On November 14, 2009, Bales participated in the keel laying for the ship.

On June 11, 2007, she delivered remarks in Washington at the unveiling of the U.S. Postal Service's commemorative stamp honoring President Ford. In July 2007, Bales represented her mother at the funeral service of former First Lady Lady Bird Johnson; in the same month, she and her husband Vaden Bales represented Mrs. Ford and the Ford family at the naming of the Gerald R. Ford Post Office in Vail, Colorado.

On November 9, 2013, she christened the Gerald R. Ford with a bottle of sparkling water.

On April 8, 2016, during a change of command ceremony aboard USS Gerald R. Ford and in recognition of her "extraordinary service as CVN 78 Ship Sponsor", she was named an honorary naval aviator by Chief of Naval Operations Admiral John Richardson, thus becoming only the 31st person to receive this honor, and the first woman ever to be so honored. The ship was commissioned as USS Gerald R. Ford on July 22, 2017, with Bales in attendance to give the order, "Man our ship, and bring her to life."

In 2018, Bales represented the Ford family at the funerals of President George H.W. and First Lady Barbara Bush.

=== Personal life ===
Susan E. Ford married Charles Vance, one of her father's former U.S. Secret Service agents, on February 10, 1979. For a time, they operated a private security company in Washington. They have two daughters, Tyne Mary Vance (born 1980) and Heather Elizabeth Vance (born 1983). Susan and Charles Vance were divorced in 1988. Susan married attorney Vaden Bales on July 25, 1989. They lived in Tulsa, Oklahoma, before moving to Albuquerque, New Mexico, in 1997, where they lived for nearly 12 years before returning to Tulsa in 2009. They divorced in 2018 and Bales relocated to McKinney, Texas.

In Betty Ford's Betty – A Glad Awakening, her mother credits Susan with having orchestrated an intervention in 1982 after the Ford family became concerned with her drinking, addictions and behavior. In 1984, along with her mother, Bales helped launch National Breast Cancer Awareness Month with a joint appearance in an ad campaign.

In 2010, at age 53, Bales went into sudden cardiac arrest while exercising on an elliptical machine. She had no prior knowledge that she had heart disease. Bales says she was "extremely lucky" that while she was in the gym, a surgeon was "walking up the steps" and "shocked" her back. She was revived with an automated external defibrillator. After her recovery, she was given a heart stent and pacemaker. She spoke of the experience on June 4, 2013, at the American Heart Association's Heart Ball in Grand Rapids.

Bales endorsed Democratic candidate Kamala Harris for President in the 2024 election.

== Cultural depictions ==
Susan Ford had a significant role in the Showtime television series The First Lady, in which she is portrayed by Dakota Fanning.

== Bibliography ==
- Degregorio, William A., The Complete Book of U.S. Presidents (5th edition), Barricade Books, Fort Lee, New Jersey, 2001.
- Wead, Doug, All the President's Children, Atria Books, New York, 2003, ISBN 0-7434-4631-3

Honorary titles
Preceded by Betty Ford	Chairwoman of Betty Ford Center; 2005–present	Incumbent
