= Holton-Arms School =

Private school in Bethesda, Maryland, US

The Holton-Arms School
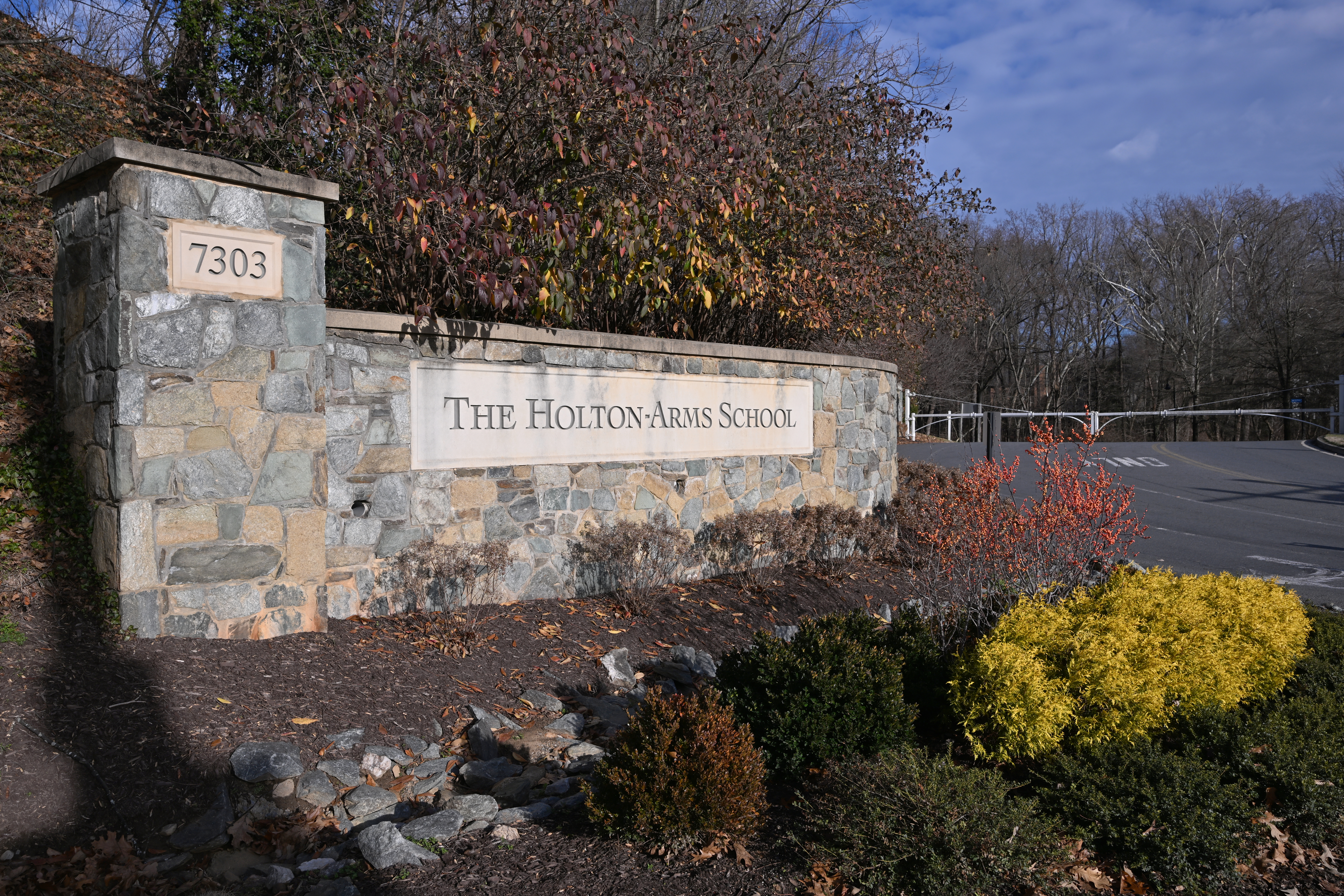

Location
- 7303 River Road; Bethesda, Maryland 20817; United States; 38°59′30″N 77°8′53″W

Information
- Type: Private, College-prep
- Motto: Inveniam viam aut faciam ("I will find a way or make one.")
- Established: 1901
- Head of School: Penny B. Evins
- Gender: Girls
- Enrollment: 665 total
- Student to teacher ratio: 7:1
- Campus: Suburban, 57 acres (23 ha)
- Colors: Blue and White
- Athletics: 15 Varsity Sports
- Athletics conference: ISL
- Mascot: Panther
- Website: www.holton-arms.edu

Holton-Arms is an independent college-preparatory school for girls in grades 3–12, located in Bethesda, Maryland. As of the 2021–22 school year, there were 667 students and 94 faculty. Since 2023, Penny B. Evins has been Head of School.

The school has three divisions: Lower School (grades 3–6), Middle School (7–8), and Upper School (9–12). Tuition for the 2026-27 school year is $60,535 for grades 3-12. In 2025–2026, the financial aid budget was $6.4 million.

== History ==
In 1901, Jessie Moon Holton and Carolyn Hough Arms founded Holton-Arms School. The school was located at 2125 S Street, NW, Washington, D.C.

Holton-Arms moved to Bethesda in 1963. Located on 57 acres (230,000 m^{2}) of rolling woodlands just off River Road, the campus has seven buildings. Its facilities include a science wing and lecture hall, two libraries, a performing arts center with a 400-seat theater and new black box theater, art and ceramic studios (with a kiln) and photo lab, three dance studios, a double gymnasium, an indoor competition-size pool, a weight and training room, and dining room renovated in 2012. Outdoor facilities include seven tennis courts, an eight-lane all-weather track, and three athletic fields, including a synthetic turf field.

The School's mission is to cultivate the unique potential of young women through the “education not only of the mind, but of the soul and spirit.” (Jessie Moon Holton, 1866–1951). The School's motto is Inveniam viam aut faciam—I will find a way or make one.

== Athletics ==
In the Upper School, Holton-Arms competes in the Independent School League. Holton-Arms has over 50 different teams and competes in 15 sports.

== Notable alumnae ==
- Susan Ford Bales, author, photojournalist, former chair of the board of the Betty Ford Center, and daughter of former United States President Gerald Ford
- Katharine Byron, former United States congressional representative for Maryland
- Shelley Moore Capito, United States senator for West Virginia
- Siribha Chudabhorn, princess of Thailand
- Juliette Crosby, actress
- Beka Economopoulos, artist, environmental activist, and co-organizer of the March for Science in 2017
- Christine Blasey Ford, professor of psychology and research psychologist
- Christine Lagarde, former managing director of the International Monetary Fund
- Julia Louis-Dreyfus, actress
- Elizabeth MacRae, actress
- Terrell McSweeny, attorney and former commissioner of the Federal Trade Commission
- Jacqueline Kennedy Onassis, writer, editor, photographer, and first lady of the United States from 1961 to 1963
- Patricia Richardson, actress
- Mishew Edgerton Smith, socialite
- Margaret Warner, reporter and senior correspondent for the PBS NewsHour
- Dede Wilsey, philanthropist, socialite, and chair emeritus of the Fine Arts Museums of San Francisco.
- Elinor Wylie, poet and novelist
- Rachael Yamagata, musician

== See also ==
- 1975 Holton-Arms School senior prom
