= Bill Whitehead Award =

Annual LGBTQ literary award

- Awarded for: Lifetime achievement for LGBTQ+ writers
- Sponsored by: Publishing Triangle
- Reward: US$1,000
- Established: 1989
- Website: http://www.publishingtriangle.org

The Bill Whitehead Award is an annual literary award, presented by Publishing Triangle, to honour lifetime achievement by writers within the LGBTQ community. First presented in 1989, the award was named in honour of Bill Whitehead, an editor with E. P. Dutton and Macmillan Publishers, who died in 1987. The award is given to a woman in even-numbered years and a man in odd-numbered years.

== Winners ==
Bill Whitehead Award winners
| Year | Winner | Ref. |
|---|---|---|
| 1989 | Edmund White | |
| 1990 | Adrienne Rich | |
| 1991 | James Purdy | |
| 1992 | Audre Lorde | |
| 1993 | Samuel R. Delany | |
| 1994 | Judy Grahn | |
| 1995 | Jonathan Ned Katz | |
| 1996 | Joan Nestle | |
| 1997 | Armistead Maupin | |
| 1998 | M. E. Kerr | |
| 1999 | John Rechy | |
| 2000 | Doris Grumbach | |
| 2001 | Michael Nava | |
| 2002 | Jane Rule | |
| 2003 | Christopher Bram | |
| 2004 | Lillian Faderman | |
| 2005 | Edward Field | |
| 2006 | Karla Jay | |
| 2007 | Andrew Holleran | |
| 2008 | Katherine V. Forrest | |
| 2009 | Martin Duberman | |
| 2010 | Blanche Wiesen Cook | |
| 2011 | Alan Hollinghurst | |
| 2012 | Alison Bechdel | |
| 2013 | John D'Emilio | |
| 2014 | Maria Irene Fornes | |
| 2015 | Rigoberto González | |
| 2016 | Eloise Klein Healy | |
| 2017 | Michael Bronski | |
| 2018 | Sarah Schulman | |
| 2019 | Jaime Manrique | |
| 2020 | Eileen Myles | |
| 2021 | Cheryl Clarke | |
| 2022 | Cherrie Moraga | |
| 2023 | Patrick Califia | |
| 2024 | Dorothy Allison | |
| 2025 | Rabih Alameddine | |
| 2026 | Chrystos | |
