= Malvina Thompson =

Private secretary to Elanor Roosevelt (1893–1953)

- Born: January 9, 1892; The Bronx, New York, U.S
- Died: April 12, 1953 (aged 60); Manhattan, New York, U.S.
- Resting place: Woodlawn Cemetery
- Other names: Malvina Schneider; Malvina Thompson Schneider
- Occupation: Private secretary
- Known for: Personal aide and private secretary to Eleanor Roosevelt
- Political party: Democratic
- Spouse: Frank Schneider (m. 1921; div. 1939)
- Parent(s): Harry and Catherine Thompson

Malvina "Tommy" Thompson (January 9, 1892 – April 12, 1953) was a private secretary and personal aide to First Lady Eleanor Roosevelt. She was a pioneer of the East Wing staff, being the first staffer for a First Lady of the United States who was not a social secretary.

== Early life ==
Malvina Thompson was born in New York City on January 9, 1892 to Harry and Catherine Thompson. She lived with her family in The Bronx until she married.

== Career ==
A high school graduate, she later became a self-taught office secretary, working first for the American Red Cross during the intense years of World War I and the 1918 influenza epidemic, and then for the New York State Democratic Committee. In these roles, she began to work with Democratic Party activist Louis McHenry Howe and Howe's friend, Eleanor Roosevelt. During the campaign of Eleanor's husband Franklin D. Roosevelt for Governor of New York, Thompson became Eleanor's personal secretary. Eleanor's daughter Anna Eleanor Roosevelt soon nicknamed her "Tommy". Franklin won the election, and Eleanor became the First Lady of New York. As Franklin had been left partially paralyzed by polio, Eleanor had to perform much of the travel and meet-and-greet duties of the Office of the Governor, and Thompson accompanied her.

"Tommy" soon became an integral part of Eleanor Roosevelt's staff. Her formal role was that of Roosevelt's scheduler, personal travel assistant, and office secretary. The First Lady relied upon Thompson to cut off her own tendencies to be sympathetic and over-generous to petitioners.

When the Roosevelts moved to the White House in March 1933, "Tommy" continued and intensified her role. Roosevelt and Thompson began operating nationwide to encourage and inspect the divisions and departments performing New Deal relief, traveling as much as 40,000 miles (65,000 km) per year. Continuing to serve as Roosevelt's personal assistant and scheduler, Thompson also took on the pioneering role of First Lady press secretary, organizing and overseeing Roosevelt's all-female press conferences and her syndicated daily newspaper column, My Day. In 1940, she strongly discouraged Roosevelt from addressing the Democratic National Convention, which no First Lady had ever done; she later told Lorena Hickok, "I did not want to see Mrs. Roosevelt sacrificed on the altar of hysteria." Roosevelt spoke at the convention nonetheless, and her speech was widely regarded as a "triumph".

One of Eleanor Roosevelt's biographers, Blanche Wiesen Cook, summarized Thompson's character and role in the Roosevelt Administration:

Entirely loyal to ER, she was efficient, protective, and open-hearted. Tommy smoked cigarettes from morning to night, drank Scotch at day's end, and saw something funny in almost every situation. ER relied on her quick-witted support, and her fabulous sense of humor. Tommy's robust and hearty laugh lit up many tense situations, and she had a good time wherever she went.

In 1939, when Eleanor Roosevelt had the opportunity to transform the Val-Kill estate at Hyde Park into her private compound, she set aside a suite of rooms in Val-Kill - two bedrooms, a living room, a kitchen and a screen porch - for Thompson to live in and use. Thompson continued her service to Mrs. Roosevelt after the former First Lady retired to Val-Kill following the death of Franklin D. Roosevelt in April 1945. The public relations work and daily newspaper column continued, now as a description of Eleanor's global role as delegate to the United Nations General Assembly and first chairperson of the United Nations Commission on Human Rights. However, Thompson's work ended in April 1953 when she was stricken with a cerebral hemorrhage, which caused neurological damage that ended with her death.

== Personal life and death ==
In 1921, Thompson married Frank Schneider, a public school teacher. They had no children, and divorced in 1939. On rare, formal occasions, she would refer to herself or be referred to as Malvina Thompson Schneider, but was usually referred to as Malvina Thompson.

Gossip was also published during the Roosevelt Administration about an alleged relationship between Roosevelt and Thompson. For example, in February 1936 an unnamed reporter for the newsweekly Time referred to Thompson, Nancy Cook, and Marion Dickerman, all of whom lived at various times at Val-Kill, as members of the First Lady's "troupe of handmaidens."

This was how Lorena Hickok summarized Thompson's final years at Val-Kill:

So Mrs. Roosevelt had spent the summer following his death moving out the things the family wanted to keep. And on April 12, 1946, the first anniversary of his death, the big house would be formally accepted by President Truman, on behalf of the American people. Mrs. Roosevelt had settled down with Tommy in a rambling two-story house that she called her "cottage," three miles away from the river and the big house.

Thompson died on April 12, 1953. Following her death, some of Eleanor Roosevelt's relatives and close friends sent her letters and notes of condolence. This correspondence survives and has been catalogued accordingly in the First Lady's section of the Franklin D. Roosevelt Presidential Library.

== Bibliography ==
- Cook, Blanche Wiesen (1992). Eleanor Roosevelt, Volume 1. Penguin. ISBN 0140094601.
- Cook, Blanche Wiesen (1999). Eleanor Roosevelt, Vol. 2: 1933–1938. Viking. ISBN 067080486X.
- Goodwin, Doris Kearns (1994). No Ordinary Time. Simon & Schuster. ISBN 9780684804484.
