= Doris Grumbach =

American novelist and biographer (1918–2022)

- Born: Doris M. Isaac; July 12, 1918; New York City, U.S.
- Died: November 4, 2022 (aged 104); Kennett Square, Pennsylvania, U.S.
- Education: Washington Square College of New York University; Cornell University
- Occupations: Novelist; memoirist; biographer; professor; bookstore owner
- Spouse: Leonard Grumbach (m. 1941; div. 1972)
- Partner: Sybil Pike (1972–2021; her death)
- Children: 4

Doris M. Grumbach (née Isaac; July 12, 1918 – November 4, 2022) was an American novelist, memoirist, biographer, literary critic, and essayist. She taught at the College of Saint Rose in Albany, New York, the Iowa Writers' Workshop, and American University in Washington, D.C., and was literary editor of The New Republic for several years. She published many novels highlighting and focusing on gay and lesbian characters. For two decades, she and her partner, Sybil Pike, operated a bookstore, Wayward Books, in Sargentville, Maine.

== Personal life ==
Doris M. Isaac was born in New York City as a fifth-generation Manhattanite, to Leonard William Isaac and Helen Oppenheimer. When she was six, her younger sister Joan Elaine Isaac was born.

She grew up in Manhattan, where she attended elementary school PS 9. A very bright student, she skipped many grades and entered high school at age eleven. She was not prepared socially for this early advancement and did poorly, developing a stammer and losing her self-confidence. She was encouraged by the principal to take a year off from high school. When she returned, she was an indifferent student in the classroom, but showed talent in theater and in creative writing. In her senior year, she won a citywide short story contest, which helped secure her admission to Washington Square College of New York University.

Isaac received her Bachelor of Arts degree from Washington Square College of New York University in 1939. She majored in philosophy and graduated Phi Beta Kappa.

In 1940, she earned her Master of Arts degree in medieval literature from Cornell University. There, she met her husband, Leonard Grumbach, who was studying for his doctorate in neurophysiology. They were married on October 5, 1941.

After the war, Grumbach moved around the country with her husband as he taught physiology. During this period, the Grumbachs had four daughters: Barbara, Jane, Elizabeth, and Kathryn. Before the birth of their fourth daughter, the Grumbachs settled in Albany, New York, where Leonard Grumbach taught at Albany Medical College and Doris Grumbach began a career in teaching.

In 1971, after raising their children, Grumbach left her husband. She spent a year in Saratoga Springs, New York, helping to set up the external degree program at Empire State College. Following her divorce, she began a relationship with Sybil Pike, who became and remained her life partner. In 1972, accepting a position at The New Republic magazine as literary editor, Grumbach and Pike moved to Washington, D.C. Pike worked for the Library of Congress.

In 1990 Grumbach and Pike moved themselves and the bookstore to Sargentville, Maine. There, Grumbach continued to write while Pike tended to the bookstore. Grumbach published another fiction novel, The Book of Knowledge, in 1995, and several memoirs focusing mostly on aging. In 2009 Wayward Books and their house in Maine were sold.

Around 2009, the couple moved to a Quaker retirement community in Kennett Square, Pennsylvania, where Pike died in March 2021, aged 91. Grumbach continued to write, contributing pieces of memoir and articles on old age to The American Scholar. Grumbach celebrated her 100th birthday in 2018, and died in Kennett Square on November 4, 2022, at the age of 104.

== Career ==
During 1940–1941, Grumbach worked for Loew's Inc./MGM writing subtitles for films distributed abroad. During 1941–1942, she was employed as a proofreader for Mademoiselle magazine and then for the journal Architectural Forum in 1942–1943, eventually rising to the position of associate editor. When her husband was drafted during World War II, Grumbach joined the U.S. Navy in 1943 as an officer in the WAVES and served from 1943 to 1945.

From 1957 to 1960, she taught senior English at the Albany Academy for Girls. In 1960, she became a professor of English at the College of Saint Rose also in Albany, New York and taught there until 1971. During her time at the college, Grumbach also began to focus on her writing career and published her first two novels, The Spoil of the Flowers (1962), and The Short Throat, The Tender Mouth (1964). In 1967 she published a literary biography of novelist Mary McCarthy titled The Company She Kept, based in part on correspondence and other documents which McCarthy had shared with Grumbach.

Grumbach worked as a literary editor for The New Republic. She wrote a column called "Fine Print". After two years, the magazine was sold and Grumbach lost her job. She remained in Washington with Pike and in 1975 accepted a position as a professor of American literature at American University. During this time, she also wrote a non-fiction column for The New York Times Book Review and her column "Fine Print" was picked up by the Saturday Review.

In 1979, Grumbach published the novel Chamber Music, which was critically well-received and helped establish her reputation as a novelist. In six years, three more books followed: The Missing Person (1981), The Ladies (1984), and The Magician's Girl (1987). During this period, Grumbach also taught creative writing at the Iowa Writers' Workshop at the University of Iowa and at Johns Hopkins University, where she substituted briefly for John Barth. Grumbach was also a book reviewer and commentator for the Morning Edition of National Public Radio and the televised MacNeil-Lehrer Newshour.

In 1985, Grumbach resigned from her professorship at American University but remained in Washington, D.C. for five more years. She and Pike opened a bookstore for rare and used books, named Wayward Books, located near Eastern Market, on Capitol Hill.

=== Critical reception of Grumbach's work ===
Several facets of Grumbach's work have won her both praise and criticism. Grumbach is often lauded as a feminist writer, championing the cause of women in her fiction and revealing the economic, social, and psychological difficulties women face. Other critics find her work not feminist enough and regard her portrayals of women characters as stilted. Grumbach is both highly regarded and often criticized for her focus on gay and lesbian characters. A number of her works, such as The Spoil of the Flowers, Chamber Music, and The Ladies, focus on gay and lesbian themes and characters. Grumbach wrote in a wide range of genres, as a novelist, literary critic, essayist, biographer, memoirist, and cultural critic.

As a writer who explored gay and lesbian themes in the 1950s and 1960s, Grumbach tends to be grouped with other groundbreaking authors who explored these themes and issues at a time in which the popular sentiment was to regard homosexuality as deviant behavior. Such writers as Ann Bannon, Marijane Meaker, May Sarton, Sylvia Townsend Warner, and Patricia Highsmith explored gay and lesbian themes in positive ways similar to Grumbach. As Ann Cothran, a literary critic of writers on lesbian themes and author of a study on Simone de Beauvoir states, perhaps Grumbach's “most important contribution to gay and lesbian literature is the manner in which she consistently represents homosexual relationships matter of factly, as an integral part of the human landscape. Grumbach depicts lesbianism as a positive, life-giving force in women's lives.”

Grumbach's novels tend to be literary and literate in tone in that she often draws upon well-known writers or writings for her titles and for references within her works. For example, she drew her title for The Spoil of the Flowers from a poetic fragment by Euripides, the title for The Short Throat, The Tender Mouth from "The Pardoner's Tale" in The Canterbury Tales by Geoffrey Chaucer, and The Magician's Girl from a poem by Sylvia Plath. In addition, Grumbach's writings often refer to well-known or arcane writings; her dialogues or internal monologues have phrases from Latin, French, and other languages.

Critics have noted that she drew from historic persons and events for her fiction. In Chamber Music, for example, she based the characters and the plot on the American composer Edward MacDowell and his wife, Marian, upon Marilyn Monroe in The Missing Person, upon Eleanor Butler and Sarah Ponsonby in The Ladies, and Sylvia Plath and Diane Arbus in The Magician's Girl.

A significant part of her reputation and the current audience is based upon her two memoirs that focus on aging: Coming into the End Zone and Extra Innings. She also explored spiritual reflections about her life in The Presence of Absence: On Prayers and an Epiphany and in her memoir Fifty Days of Solitude. Grumbach penned introductions and critical assessments of the works of such writers as Willa Cather, Edith Wharton, and Zora Neale Hurston. Grumbach also wrote an influential review of the novel Wise Blood by Flannery O'Connor. Her article on an aborted plan to write a biography of Willa Cather was published in The American Scholar in January 2001.

Grumbach remains an important author for the focus she brought to women's lives and women's struggles in the redefinition of women's roles from the 1950s onward. This dimension is especially true with regard to her positive presentations of lesbians and lesbian lifestyles. Grumbach is admired for her writing style and characterization, which often presents overtones of Henry James and of Gustave Flaubert and Jane Austen in Grumbach's focus upon social conventions and their influence upon the development of individual lives and psyches. Grumbach is one of several 20th-century women writers, such as Sylvia Townsend Warner, Valentine Ackland, and Katherine Mansfield, who represents a transition from Victorian styles and emphases combined with the social and psychological concerns of modernism. Grumbach's papers (from 1938 to 2002) are archived in the New York Public Library (Humanities and Social Sciences Library, Manuscripts and Archives Division).

She received the Bill Whitehead Award for Lifetime Achievement from Publishing Triangle in 2000.

== Bibliography ==
=== Novels ===
- The Spoil of the Flowers (1962)
- The Short Throat, The Tender Mouth (1964)
- Chamber Music (1979)
- The Missing Person (1981)
- The Ladies (1984)
- The Magician's Girl (1987)
- The Book of Knowledge (1995)

=== Non-fiction ===
- The Company She Kept: A Revealing Portrait of Mary McCarthy (1967)
- "Father Church and the motherhood of God". From the Archives. Commonweal. 150 (1): 18–19. January 2023. (Note: Originally published in 1970.)

Memoirs

- Coming into the End Zone (1991)
- Extra Innings (1993)
- Fifty Days of Solitude (1994)
- Life in a Day (1996)
- The Presence of Absence: On Prayers and an Epiphany (1998)
- The Pleasure of Their Company (2001)

=== Children's books ===
- Lord, I Have No Courage (1964)

———————
