= Blanche Wiesen Cook =

American historian

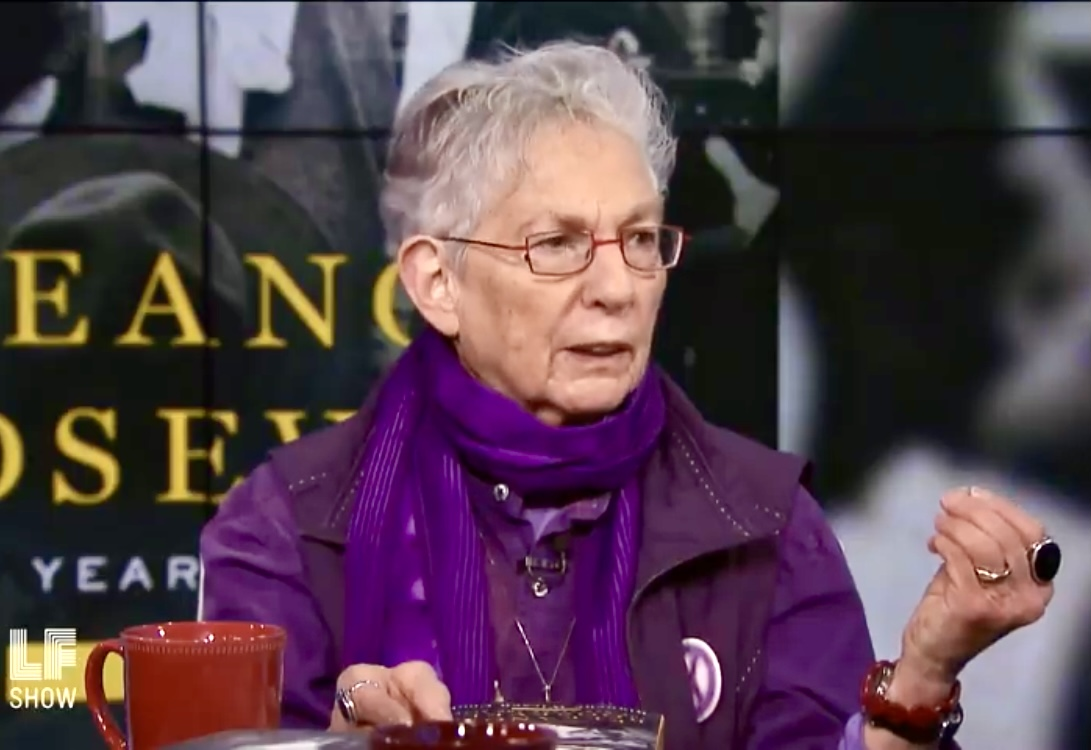
- Blanche Wiesen Cook in 2018
- Born: April 20, 1941 (age 85); New York City
- Occupations: Historian and professor
- Notable work: Eleanor Roosevelt, 3-volume biography

Blanche Wiesen Cook (born April 20, 1941 in New York City) is a historian and professor of history. She is a recipient of the Bill Whitehead Award.

== Books ==
Cook is the author of a three-volume biography about Eleanor Roosevelt: Eleanor Roosevelt: Volume One 1884–1933 (published 1992); Eleanor Roosevelt: Volume 2, The Defining Years, 1933–1938 (2000); and Eleanor Roosevelt, Volume 3: The War Years and After, 1939-1962 (2016). Volume One was awarded the 1992 Biography prize from the Los Angeles Times. A New York Times review of the third volume called the entire biography a "rich portrait" of the "monumental and inspirational life of Eleanor Roosevelt." NPR included the third volume in its "Best books of 2016." Notably, the biography details a disputed affair between Eleanor Roosevelt and reporter Lorena Hickok. (This affair has itself been the subject of other books.)

She edited Toward the Great Change: Crystal and Max Eastman on Feminism, Antimilitarism, and Revolution, published in 1976, and Crystal Eastman on Women and Revolution, published in 1978.

Cook is also the author of The Declassified Eisenhower: A Divided Legacy of Peace and Political Warfare, which was listed as a "notable book" in 1981 by The New York Times.

Cook wrote opinion pieces for The New York Times, including "Clearly, Eisenhower Was a 'Militant Liberal'" (1980) and "The Trashing of CUNY" (1994).

== Academic career ==
She is a Distinguished Professor of History and Women's Studies at John Jay College of Criminal Justice, City University of New York. She is also a distinguished professor at the Graduate Center, CUNY.

An oral history interview with Cook is included in the Living U.S. women's history oral history project, 1999–2005, in which 51 scholars of women's history were interviewed. These oral histories are housed in the Sophia Smith Collection of Women's History at Smith College.

Cook co-founded the Freedom of Information and Access Committee of the Organization of American Historians, is a former vice president for research at the American Historical Association, and was chair of the Fund for Open Information and Accountability.

In 1988, Cook took part in The History and Consequences of Anticommunism conference, where she argued that “every moment of our era has been touched and diminished by this crusade.”

== Honors ==
Cook received the 2010 Bill Whitehead Award for Lifetime Achievement from the Publishing Triangle.
