= 1975 Holton-Arms School senior prom =

1975 high school dance held at the White House

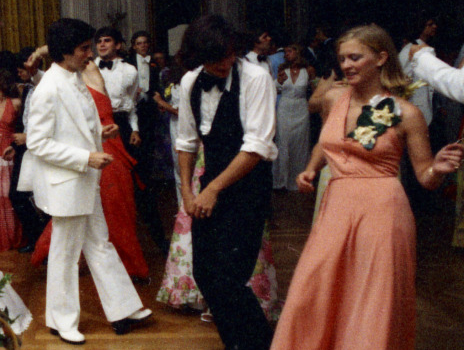
- William "Billy" Pifer (left) and Susan Ford (right) dance at the 1975 Holton-Arms School senior prom
- Date: May 31, 1975
- Duration: Approximately five hours
- Venue: White House
- Also known as: 1975 White House prom
- Type: Senior prom
- Budget: $1,300

The 1975 Holton-Arms School senior prom, sometimes referred to as the 1975 White House prom, was a senior prom held in the White House. The prom was held on May 31, 1975, organized by Holton-Arms School in Bethesda, Maryland for the seniors of the 1974–75 school year. The senior Susan Ford, President Gerald Ford's daughter, successfully petitioned the White House staff to permit them to use the space. The prom was generally well received by participants.

== Background ==
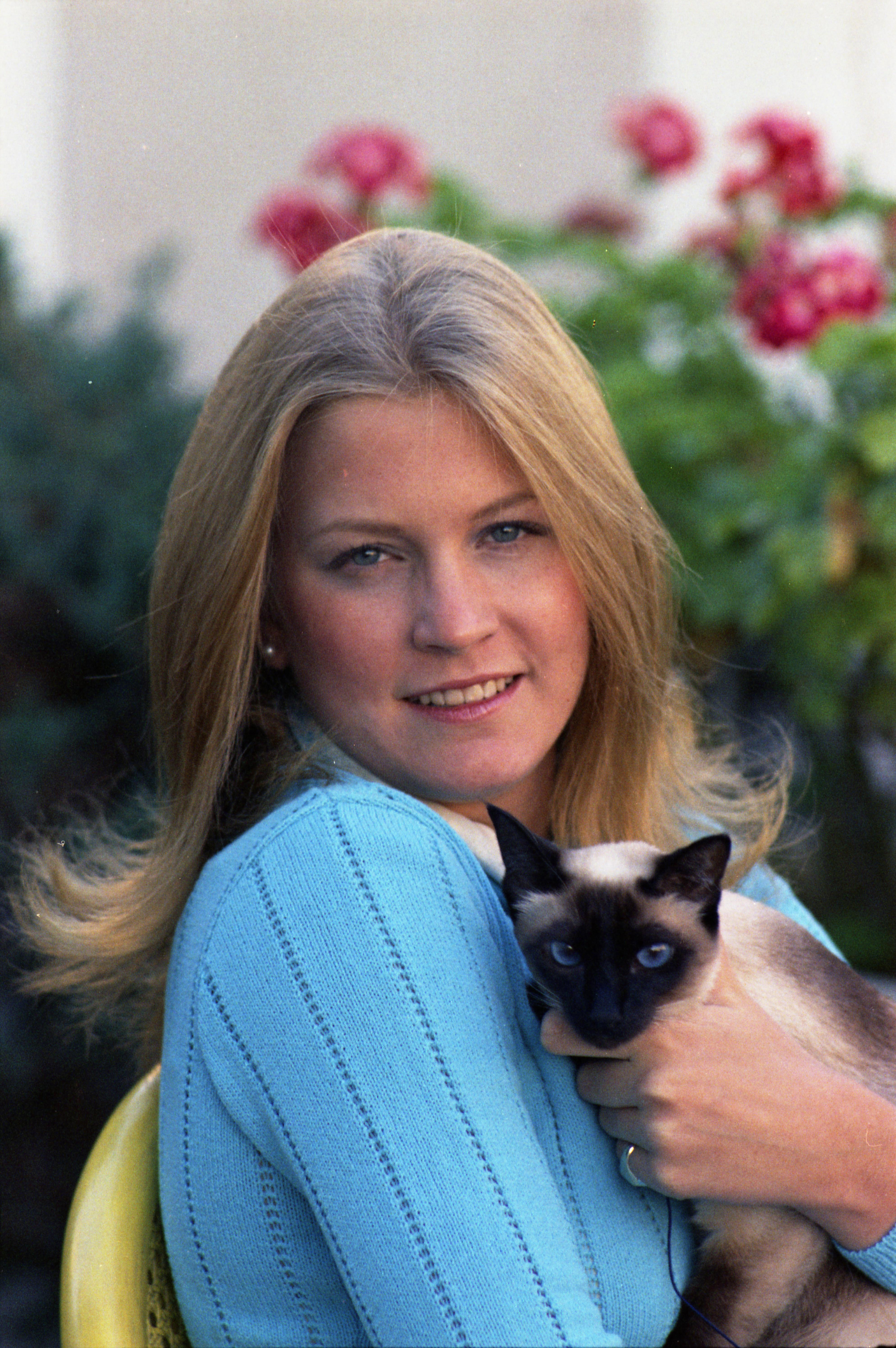
Susan Ford, pictured here in 1974 with the cat Shan Shein, has been credited with booking the venue for the 1975 Holton-Arms School senior prom

In 1975 Susan Ford, daughter of President Gerald Ford, was in her final year of classes at Holton-Arms School. At the suggestion of her classmates, she petitioned White House Chief Usher Rex Scouten that they be permitted to hold that year's senior class prom at the White House. The request was granted on several conditions. First, no expenses associated with the dance could be borne by the United States Government. Second, all attendees were required to provide their names, dates of birth, and Social Security numbers to the United States Secret Service a minimum of thirty days prior to the event. Finally, members of the band selected to perform at the prom could not have any outstanding drug charges against them. The cost of the dance, which totaled $1,300 (equivalent to $7,778 in 2025), was ultimately raised by members of Holton-Arms's senior class.

== Event ==
President Ford and First Lady Betty Ford were out of town during the event. Susan Ford planned on attending with her longtime boyfriend, Gardner Britt, but they had broken up prior to the dance; Ford went with Billy Pifer instead. Prior to the dance, Ford and Pifer, as well as three other couples, took a cruise aboard the presidential yacht USS Sequoia. Other students had a pre-function at the Sulgrave Club.

The prom committee attempted to book The Beach Boys for the dance, but were unable to secure the band. Instead, two lesser-known bands were booked: Sandcastle and the Outerspace Band, the latter of which charged a $350 (equivalent to $2,094 in 2025) performance fee.

Seventy-four Holton-Arms seniors and their dates attended the dance. The event concluded at approximately 1:00 a.m., thirty minutes later than originally scheduled. Several after-parties were organized, including one in the Executive Residence.

== Legacy ==
Students later expressed their approval of the event; 12th grader Ned Faruqahar described the dance as "dynamite, virtual dynamite". Ford herself, however, said it was "just like any other prom". As of 2015, according to Vanity Fair, it is the only high school dance held at the White House in that building's history.

== See also ==
- Presidency of Gerald Ford
