= Lorena Hickok =

American journalist (1893–1968)

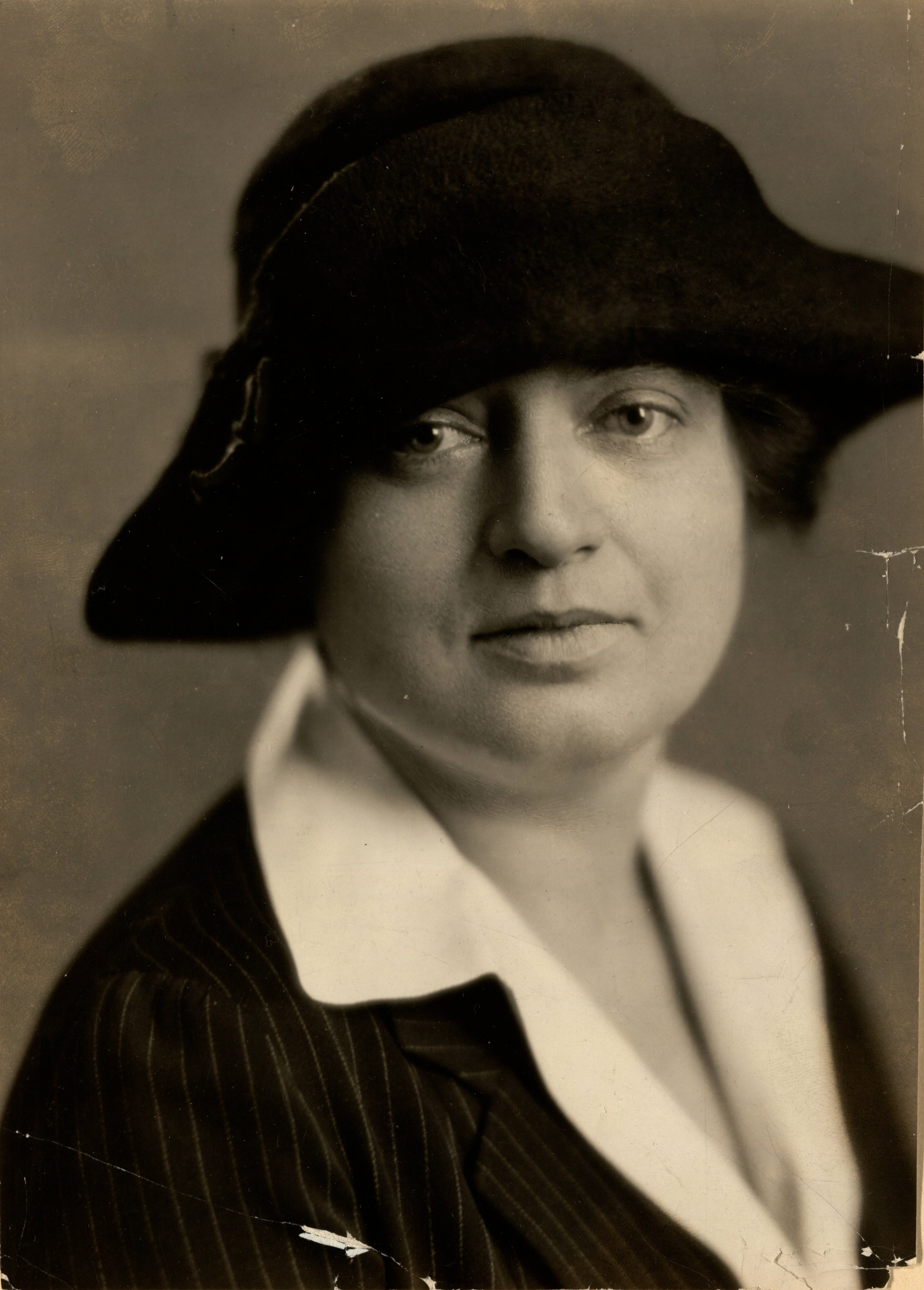
- Hickok in 1926
- Born: Lorena Alice Hickok; March 7, 1893; East Troy, Wisconsin, U.S.
- Died: May 1, 1968 (aged 75); Hyde Park, New York, U.S.
- Burial place: Rhinebeck Cemetery, Hyde Park, New York, U.S.
- Other names: Hick; Lorena Lawrence
- Education: Lawrence College (dropped out); University of Minnesota (dropped out)
- Occupations: Journalist; public relations official
- Years active: 1912–1940s
- Known for: Journalism; relationship with Eleanor Roosevelt

Lorena Alice "Hick" Hickok (March 7, 1893 – May 1, 1968) was an American journalist. She was also a long-term friend and possibly romantic partner of First Lady Eleanor Roosevelt.

After an unhappy and unsettled childhood, Hickok found success as a reporter for the Minneapolis Tribune and the Associated Press (AP), becoming America's best-known female reporter by 1932. After covering Franklin D. Roosevelt's first presidential campaign, Hickok struck up a close relationship with the soon-to-be First Lady, and travelled with her extensively. The nature of their relationship has been widely debated, especially after 3000 of their mutual letters were discovered, confirming some level of physical intimacy. Hickok was known to be a lesbian. The closeness of their relationship compromised Hickok's objectivity, leading her to resign from the AP and work as chief investigator for the Federal Emergency Relief Administration (FERA). She later promoted the 1939 New York World's Fair, and then served as executive secretary of the Women's Division of the Democratic National Committee, living mostly at the White House, where Hickok had a conjoining room with the First Lady. Hickok was the author of several books.

== Early life and career ==
Lorena Alice Hickok was born on March 7, 1893, in East Troy, Wisconsin, to Addison J. Hickok, a dairy farmer who specialized in making butter, and Anna Hickok (née Anna Adelia Wiate; died 1906). She had two sisters, Ruby Adelsa (later Ruby Claff, 1896–1971) and Myrtle. Her father was an alcoholic and was not consistently employed. When Lorena was 10 years old, the family moved to Bowdle, South Dakota, where, in 1906, when Lorena was 13 years old, her mother, Anna, died of a stroke. In 1908, two years after his wife's passing, Addison married Emma Flashman, a divorcee who had worked as a housekeeper for the family after Anna's passing. Lorena's relationship with Addison was poor. He was abusive and neglectful towards her, and did not come to her defense when Emma forced her out of the family home.

Having lost support from her father, 14-year-old Lorena worked variously as a housekeeper for an Irish family, in a boarding house infested with mice, in a rooming house for railroad workers on the edge of town, and in a farm kitchen. During her time at the rooming house, Hickok was forced to barricade her door with a chair so that male visitors to the house would not be able to enter her room while she slept. She saw her father one more time in her life, when she was 15 years old, while on a train. Addison had no polite words for his eldest daughter, but the experience was a liberating one for the girl, who left the train with the realization that she was now an adult and her father could no longer strike her.

Hickok made her way to Gettysburg, South Dakota, where she met and worked for a reportedly kind, elderly lady named Mrs. Dodd, who helped her to learn how to be an adult, teaching the teenager basic skills such as how to wash her hair. Under Dodd's influence, Hickok decided to return to Bowdle to go to school. In exchange for room and board, she started working for a wealthy family, the Bicketts. The living situation was not a good one for Hickok, as the wife demanded she devote all her free time to keeping house, which came at the expense of schoolwork. She left the Bicketts to live with the O'Malleys, who owned a saloon and were viewed with disdain.

Unlike the Bickett family, Hickok found friendship with the couple, particularly the wife, who was somewhat of an outcast in Bowdle, not only for her family's source of income, but also for wearing makeup and wigs and drinking alcohol. Hickok was ultimately able to find some stability within her family in 1909, when she left South Dakota to meet Ella Ellis, a cousin whom she called Aunt Ella, in Chicago, Illinois. Prior to her departure, Mrs. O'Malley paid for her train fare and dressed her for the occasion. From there on, Hickock went on to graduate from high school in Battle Creek, Michigan, and in 1912 she enrolled at Lawrence College in Appleton, Wisconsin, but dropped out.

Unable to fit in at college, Hickok found work covering train arrivals and departures and wrote personal interest stories at The Battle Creek Evening News for $7 a week. In an attempt to follow in the footsteps of her role model, novelist and former reporter Edna Ferber, she joined the Milwaukee Sentinel as its society editor and then moved on to the city beat, where she developed a talent as an interviewer. She interviewed celebrities, including actress Lillian Russell, pianist Ignacy Paderewski, and opera singers Nellie Melba and Geraldine Farrar, gaining a wide audience. She also became close friends with diva Ernestine Schumann-Heink.

Hickok moved to Minneapolis to work for the Minneapolis Tribune. She enrolled at the University of Minnesota, but left when she was forced to live in a women's dormitory. She stayed with the Tribune, where she was given opportunities unusual for a female reporter. She had a byline and was the paper's chief reporter, covering politics and sports and preparing editorials. During her tenure with the paper, she also covered the football team, becoming one of the first female reporters to be assigned a sports beat. In 1923, she won an award from the Associated Press for writing the best feature story of the month, a piece on President Warren G. Harding's funeral train.

During her years in Minneapolis, Hickok lived with a society reporter named Ella Morse, with whom she had an eight-year relationship. In 1926, Hickok was diagnosed with diabetes, and Morse persuaded her take a year's leave from the newspaper so the pair could travel to San Francisco and Hickok could write a novel. At the beginning of the leave, however, Morse unexpectedly eloped with an ex-boyfriend, leaving Hickok devastated. Unable to face a return to Minneapolis, Hickok moved to New York, landing a job with the New York Daily Mirror.

After working for The Mirror for about a year, Hickok obtained a job with the Associated Press in 1928, where she became one of the wire service's top correspondents. Unusually for the time, she was assigned hard-news stories, which female journalists rarely were allowed to cover. Instead, they were assigned soft-news stories, which were thought to be more feminine. Her November 1928 story on the sinking of the SS Vestris was published in The New York Times under her own byline, the first woman's byline to appear in the paper. She also reported on the Lindbergh kidnapping and other national events. By 1932, she had become the nation's best-known female reporter. Hickok called herself by this time "the top gal reporter in the country".

== Early relationship with Eleanor Roosevelt ==
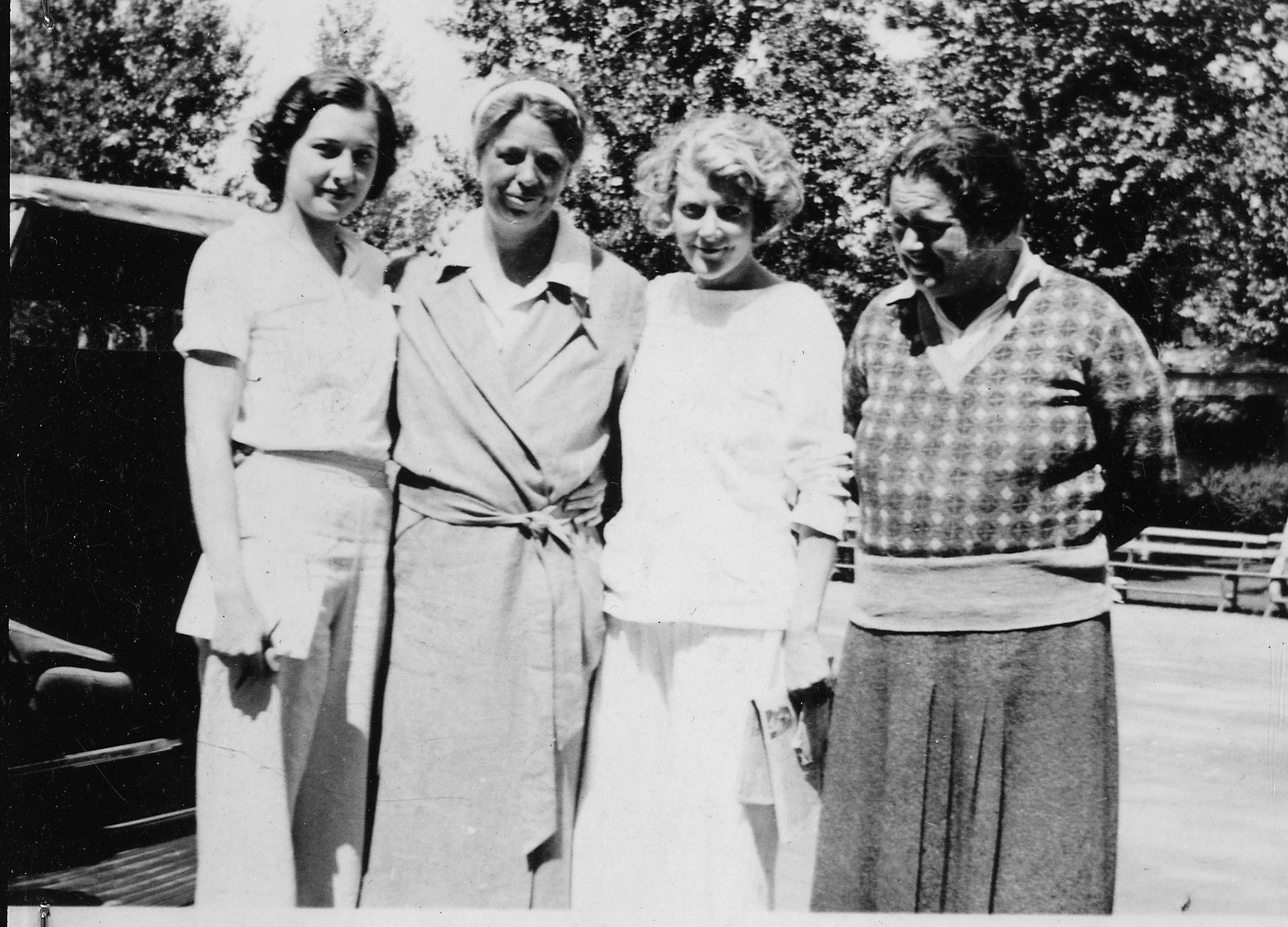
Hickok (far right) with Eleanor Roosevelt (2nd from left) in 1933

Hickok first met Roosevelt in 1928 when assigned to interview her by the AP. In 1932, Hickok convinced her editors to allow her to cover Eleanor Roosevelt during her husband's presidential campaign and for the four-month period between his election and inauguration. When the mother of Franklin's secretary, Missy LeHand, died, Eleanor invited Hickok to accompany her to Potsdam, New York, for the funeral. The women spent the long train ride talking, beginning a long friendship.

During the 1932 election, Hickok always submitted her stories about Eleanor Roosevelt to the subject first for her approval or to Louis Howe, the campaign adviser to Franklin Roosevelt, becoming by the end of the election an unofficial press attaché for Eleanor. By Franklin's inauguration on March 4, 1933, Hickok had become Eleanor's closest friend. The two made trips together to Albany and Washington, D.C., and spent nearly every day in each other's company. Hickok joined the Roosevelts every Sunday night for dinner, while on other nights Eleanor joined Hickok at the theater or opera, or at dinners alone at Hickok's apartment. For the inauguration, Eleanor wore a sapphire ring Hickok had given her.

That same day, Hickok interviewed Roosevelt in a White House bathroom, her first official interview as First Lady. By this time, Hickok was deeply in love with Roosevelt and finding it increasingly difficult to provide objective reporting. In addition, Hickok's job kept her largely in New York, while Eleanor was in Washington. Both women were troubled by the separation, professing their love by telephone and letter; Roosevelt put a picture of Hickok up in her study, which she told Hickok she kissed every night and every morning. During this period, Roosevelt wrote daily ten- to fifteen-page letters to "Hick", who was planning to write a biography of the First Lady.

The nature of Hickok and Roosevelt's relationship has been a subject of dispute among historians. Roosevelt was close friends with several lesbian couples, such as Nancy Cook and Marion Dickerman, and Esther Lape and Elizabeth Fisher Read, suggesting that she understood lesbianism; Marie Souvestre, Roosevelt's childhood teacher and a great influence on her later thinking, was also a lesbian. Hickok biographer Doris Faber published some of Roosevelt and Hickok's correspondence in 1980, but concluded that the lovestruck phrasing was simply an "unusually belated schoolgirl crush" and warned historians not to be misled. Researcher Leila J. Rupp criticized Faber's argument, calling her book "a case study in homophobia" and arguing that Faber unwittingly presented "page after page of evidence that delineates the growth and development of a love affair between the two women". In 1992, Roosevelt biographer Blanche Wiesen Cook argued that the relationship was in fact romantic, generating national attention.

Biographer Doris Kearns Goodwin summarized the letters between Hickok and Roosevelt thus:

Hick longed to kiss the soft spot at the corner of Eleanor's mouth; Eleanor yearned to hold Hick close; Hick despaired at being away from Eleanor; Eleanor wished she could lie down beside Hick and take her in her arms. Day after day, month after month, the tone in the letters on both sides remains fervent and loving.

Goodwin concluded, however, that "whether Hick and Eleanor went beyond kisses and hugs" cannot be known for certain, and that the important issue is the impact the close relationship had on both women's lives. A 2011 essay by Russell Baker reviewing two new Roosevelt biographies in the New York Times Review of Books stated, "That the Hickok relationship was indeed erotic now seems beyond dispute considering what is known about the letters they exchanged."

== In the Roosevelt administration ==
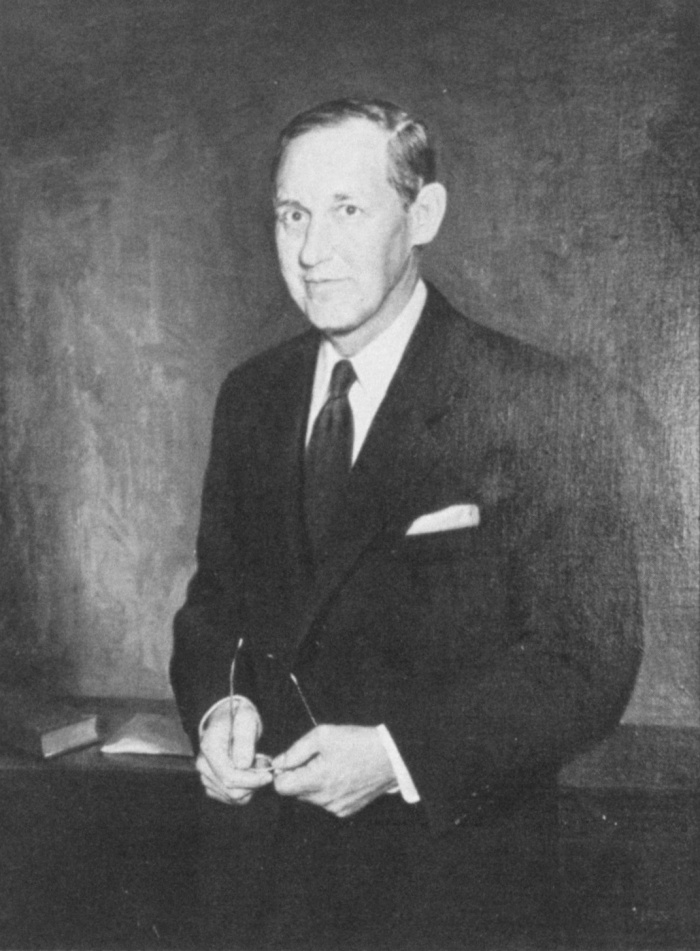
From 1933 to 1936, Hickok was the lead investigator for Federal Emergency Relief Administration head Harry Hopkins (pictured).

Early in the Roosevelt administration, Hickok is credited with pushing Eleanor to write her own newspaper column, "My Day", and to hold weekly press conferences specifically for female journalists. Hickok found it difficult to objectively cover the Roosevelts herself, however, and once suppressed a story at Eleanor's request. The declining quality of her reporting soon caused her to receive a pay cut. Despite her worries about leaving the career on which she had built her identity, Hickok resigned from the Associated Press at Eleanor's urging in June 1933. They spent the next month on vacation in New England and in the Atlantic provinces of Canada.

With support from Eleanor, Hickok obtained the position as a Chief Investigator for Harry Hopkins' Federal Emergency Relief Administration (FERA), where she conducted fact-finding missions. Hopkins told Hickok: "What I want to you is to go around the country and look this thing over. I don't want statistics from you. I don't want the social worker angle. I just want your own reaction, as an ordinary citizen". She traveled in a car that Eleanor had brought her which she named Bluette.

She headed first for the region of Appalachia, visiting the coal-mining districts of western Pennsylvania and West Virginia. She reported about the lives of the miners: "Some of them have been starving for eight years. I was told there are children in West Virginia who never tasted milk! I visited one group of 45 blacklisted miners and their families who had been living in tents two years...Most of the women you see in the camps are going without shoes or stockings...It's fairly common to see children entirely naked". She reported that the most common causes of death in West Virginia were tuberculosis, asthma, typhoid, diphtheria, pellagra, and malnutrition. Many people in West Virginia where she reported "had been living for days on green corn and string beans—and precious little of that. At the Continental Hotel in Pineville, I was told that five babies up one of those creeks had died of starvation in the last ten days...Dysentery is so common that nobody says much about it."

About the people of Appalachia, Hickok wrote that they were patriotic, religious and of "pure Anglo-Saxon stock", and she found them "curiously appealing". At the same time she criticized them for their apathy, observing that they were willing to accept their fate as what God had intended for them. In the summer of 1933, she reported that 62 percent of people in the eastern counties of Kentucky were living on federal relief, while another 150,000 people depended upon relief payments from the state government to feed their families. On 12 August 1933, the Commonwealth of Kentucky stopped relief payments because of a lack of funds, leading people going to the relief offices to find them closed and then wandering away silently. Hickok wrote: "I cannot for the life of me understand why they don't go down and raid the Blue Grass country".

From Iowa, she wrote to Hopkins in October 1933 that the Depression "is 10 or 12 years old out here" and Sioux City was a "hotbed of the Reds". The same month she wrote from Minnesota that the farmers were growing unhappy with President Roosevelt as one farm leader told her: "We were promised a New Deal...Instead, we have the same old stacked deck". In a letter to Eleanor from North Dakota she stated: "These plains are beautiful. But, oh, the terrible, crushing drabness of life here. And the suffering, for both people and animals...Most of the farm buildings haven't been painted in God only knows how long...If I had to live here, I think I'd just quietly call it a day and commit suicide....The people up here are in a daze. A sort of nameless dread hangs over the place". In Morton County, North Dakota, Hickok left a church and found several farmers huddled around her car, trying to stay warm from the car's engine's heat on a cold winter day. One farm wife Hickok met had 10 children and was pregnant with her 11th child, saying she wished she had some contraceptives as she and her husband could not afford such a large family. Hickok wrote: "The plight of the livestock is pitiable...Half-starved horses have dropped in the harness right on the road job...They've even harvested Russian thistle to feed to their horses and cattle. Russian thistle, for your information, is a thistle plant with shallow roots that dries up in the fall and is blown across the plains like rolls of barbed wire. The effect on the digestive apparatus of an animal...would be, I should imagine, much the same as though it had eaten barbed wire".

She called South Dakota "the Siberia of the United States. A more hopeless place I never saw. Half the people—particularly the farmers—are scared to death...The rest of the people are apathetic". She found several farm wives serving Russian thistle soup to their children. Out on the South Dakota plains, she visited "...what had once been a house. No repairs have made in years. The kitchen floor was all patched up with pieces of tin...Great patches of plaster had fallen from the walls. Newspapers had been stuffed in the cracks about the windows. And in that house two small boys...were running about without a stitch on save some ragged overalls. No shoes or stockings. Their feet were purple with cold".

Hickok reported that some of the normally conservative farmers of South Dakota were blaming capitalism for their plight and were turning towards Communism, whose meetings were well attended. She also noted the Farm Holiday Association, which called for the end of banks foreclosing on farms, was growing popular on the Great Plains. When one bank foreclosed on a South Dakota farm and asked the county sheriff to evict the farmer and his family, she saw the "Family Holiday crowd" disarm the sheriff's deputies at gunpoint and "ended up tearing off the sheriff's clothes and beating him quite badly". But at the same time, she noted that for all the fury and violence of the Farm Holiday movement that the prevailing mood was still apathy, writing: "I was told in Bismarck that in the country I visited this afternoon I would find a good deal of unrest—'farm holiday' spirit. I can't say that I did. They seemed almost too patient for me". In December 1933, Eleanor wrote her: "Mr. Hopkins said today that your reports would be the best history of the Depression in future years".

In December 1933, Hickok went on a two-month tour of the American South, where she was horrified by the poverty, malnutrition, and lack of education that she encountered. Hickok found life in the South even worse than on the Great Plains, which she previously found to be very "depressing". In January 1934, she reported that she had seen in rural Georgia "half-starved Whites and Blacks struggle in competition for less to eat than my dog gets at home, for the privilege of living in huts that are infinitely less comfortable than his kennel...If there is a school system in the state, it simply isn't functioning. It can't. The children just can't go to school, hundreds of them because they haven't the clothes. The illiterate parents of hundreds of others don't send them. As a result you've got the picture of hundreds of boys and girls in their teens down here in some of these rural areas who can't read or write. I'm not exaggerating...Why, some of them can barely talk!".

In Savannah, a relief director told her: "Any Nigger who gets over $8 a week is a spoiled Nigger, that's all...The Negroes regard the President as the Messiah, and think that they'll all be getting $12 a week for the rest of their lives". In Florida, she wrote that she found seasonal farm workers on the citrus farms living in "peonage", while the hotels on the coasts were "comfortably filled". The citrus farmers of Florida had she wrote "got the world licked...for being mean-spirited, selfish and irresponsible". In February 1934, she reported from North Carolina about sharecropping: "The truth is that the rural South never has progressed beyond slave labor...When their slaves were taken away, they proceeded to establish a system of peonage that was as close to slavery as it possibly could be and included Whites as well as Blacks." From the textile mill towns of the Carolinas, Hickok wrote about the "blocks and blocks of shabby, tumbledown little houses" inhibited by the "lintheads" as the textile workers called themselves. They were not normally paid cash but rather company scrip, which could only be used to purchase food at company stores.

Hickok urged Eleanor to visit a tent city of homeless ex-miners in Morgantown, West Virginia, an experience that led Eleanor to found the federal housing project of Arthurdale, West Virginia. In March 1934, Hickok accompanied Eleanor on a fact-finding trip to the U.S. territory of Puerto Rico, reporting afterward to Hopkins that the island's poverty was too severe for FERA to usefully intervene.

One of Hickok's most important conclusions was the Great Depression did not just plunge a prosperous nation into poverty, but rather that there was an "old poverty". Hickok reported that even before 1929 there were about 40 million Americans already living in poverty, which included virtually the entire non-white population, almost the entire rural population and most of the old. She concluded that all the Depression had done was merely make things worse for people who were already struggling. Hopkins praised her for discovering "a volume of chronic poverty, unsuspected except by a few students and by those who always experienced it".

In the town of Calais, Maine she found that most of the unemployed were Catholic French-Canadians, while the relief workers were White Anglo-Saxon Protestants. Owing to religious and ethnic prejudices, Hickok reported "the people on relief in that town are subjected to a treatment that is almost medieval in its stinginess and stupidity". From Tennessee, she reported that she found relief workers "whose approach to the relief problem is so typical of the old line social worker, supported by private philanthropy and looking down his—only usually it was her—nose at God's patient poor, that it made me gag a little".

In Texas, she visited an "intake" facility (where people applying for relief were assessed) and wrote: "Mr. Hopkins, did you ever spend a couple of hours sitting in an intake? Intake is about the nearest thing to Hell that I know anything about. The smell alone—I'd recognize it anywhere. And take that on top of the psychological effect of having to be there at all. God!" Hickok reported many of the people applying for relief were full of guilt and shame. The ethos of the "American Dream" had been so deeply engraved into the minds of so many Americans that those who found themselves without a job tended to blame themselves, feeling that their unemployment was due to some personal flaw that had condemned them to be failures, in a society where in theory anyone would be successful with the right attitude. Such feelings were especially common with those who had formerly had white collar jobs as Hickok found them "dumb with misery" as they faced unemployment.

In New Orleans, a newspaper editor told Hickok: "The whole white collar class are taking an awful beating. They're whipped, that's all. And it's bad". One unemployed engineer told her "I had to murder my pride" before applying for relief. In Alabama, a lumberman told her "It took me a month [to apply for relief]. I used to go down there every day or so and walk past the place again and again. I just couldn't make myself go in". One 28-year-old laid-off teacher in Texas, fired as she was the most junior teacher, dejectedly told her: "If I can't make a living, I'm just no good, I guess". The mayor of Toledo, Ohio told Hickok: "I have seen thousands of these defeated, discouraged, hopeless men and women, cringing and fawning as they come to ask for public aid. It is a spectacle of national degeneration".

During her time with FERA, Hickok developed a dislike of reporters. In one report to Hopkins in 1934, she wrote: "Believe me, the next state administrator who lets out any publicity on me is going to get his head cracked". In February 1934, Time called her "a rotund lady with a husky voice, a peremptory manner, baggy clothes", a description that wounded Hickok. In a letter to Hopkins' secretary, she asked, "Why the Hell CAN'T they leave me alone?" Following the incident, Hickok and Roosevelt redoubled their efforts to keep their relationship out of the spotlight; on one occasion, Roosevelt wrote to her, "We must must be careful this summer & keep it out of the papers when we are off together."

In April 1934, a Texas businessman told her that the solution to America's problems was fascism as he maintained democracy was doomed. Hickok told Hopkins: "Honestly, after nearly a year of travelling about this country, I'm almost forced to agree with him. If I were 20 years younger and weighed 75 pounds less, I think I'd start out to be Joan of Arc of the Fascist movement in the United States...I've been out on this trip now for a little more than two weeks. In all that time I've hardly met a single person who seemed confident and cheerful. Relief loads are mounting. They can't see any improvement...Nobody seems to think any more that the thing [the New Deal] is going to WORK". From the Imperial Valley in California, she reported that the wealthy landowners were "simply hysterical" about the prospect of the Communists organizing the masses of the unemployed to lead a revolution. She wrote to Hopkins, "It looks as through we're in this relief business for a long, long time...The majority of those over 45 probably will NEVER get their jobs back".

As Roosevelt became more active as first lady, however, she had less time for Hickok. Hickok grew angry and jealous at perceived slights, and demanded more time alone, which Roosevelt was unable to give; at other times, she attempted unsuccessfully to separate herself from Roosevelt. Though the pair remained friends throughout their lives, they continued to grow apart in the years that followed. In 1937, Roosevelt wrote to Hickok that "I never meant to hurt you in any way, but that is no excuse having done it...I am pulling back from all my contacts now...Such cruelty & stupidity is unpardonable when you reach my age."

After an incident with her diabetes while traveling, Hickok resigned her FERA post for health reasons in late 1936.

== World's Fair ==
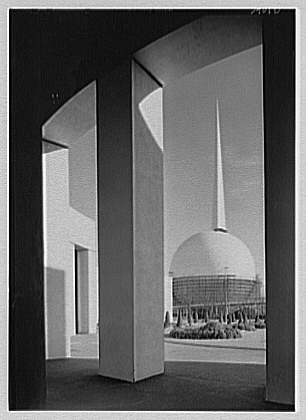
From 1936 to 1939, Hickok worked in public relations for the 1939 New York World's Fair.

On the advice of Roosevelt's secretary, Malvina Thompson, Hickok then sought work in New York with public relations man and politician Grover Whalen. Shortly after Franklin Roosevelt's 1936 re-election, Hickok was hired by Whalen to do publicity for the 1939 New York World's Fair. Opportunities for female employees of the Fair were limited, and she found the work unrewarding compared to her reporting days. Hickok primarily worked on promoting the fair to young people, including arranging class trips. Because Hickok rented both a country home and an apartment, she often faced financial problems despite her good salary during these years, and Roosevelt occasionally sent her small gifts of money.

== Democratic National Committee ==
With help from Roosevelt, Hickok became the executive secretary of the Women's Division of the Democratic National Committee (DNC) in February 1940, doing groundwork for the 1940 election. Taking to the road again, she wrote Roosevelt, "This job is such fun, dear ... It's the nearest thing to newspaper work I've found since I left the A.P."

From early January 1941 until shortly after FDR's fourth inauguration in 1945, she lived at the White House. During her time there, Hickok's nominal address was at the Mayflower Hotel in DC, where she met most people. Also during this time, she formed an intense friendship with Marion Janet Harron, a United States Tax Court judge who was ten years younger than she and almost the only person to visit her at the White House.

When Hickok's diabetes worsened in 1945, she was forced to leave her position with the DNC. Two years later, Roosevelt found her a position with the New York State Democratic Committee. When Hickok's health continued to decline, she moved to Hyde Park to be closer to Roosevelt. She lived in a cottage on the Roosevelt estate, where she died in 1968. She is buried at Rhinebeck Cemetery in Rhinebeck, New York.

== Personal life and death ==
Hickok's interest in women began when she was young and over the course of her life, she had multiple long-term relationships with women. Some of her lovers ultimately married men or were married to men at the time they were with Hickok. After Eleanor Roosevelt's husband Franklin D. Roosevelt won the presidency, Hickok lived in the White House. Some believe that she had an affair with Mrs. Roosevelt. The relationship ended when Roosevelt traveled to Geneva to work on drafting the Universal Declaration of Human Rights and took interest in her male doctor, Swiss physician Arno David Gurewitsch.

Hickok had diabetes, which eventually led to her death. She used the condition to avoid social situations, claiming it made it difficult for her to dine with others, but Hickok had always enjoyed her own company or that of her dogs, Prinz and Mr. Choate. Hickok relied on her sister, Ruby Claff, a nurse, to help her during her ill health, as she had not only diabetes but blindness and arthritis in her later years.

Hickok died at the age of 75. She was cremated and, for two decades, her ashes sat in an urn in a funeral home before being buried in an unmarked grave. A marker was finally placed on the site on May 10, 2000, describing her as "Hick" and an "A.P. (Associated Press) reporter, an author, an activist, and friend of E.R. (Eleanor Roosevelt)."

== Legacy ==
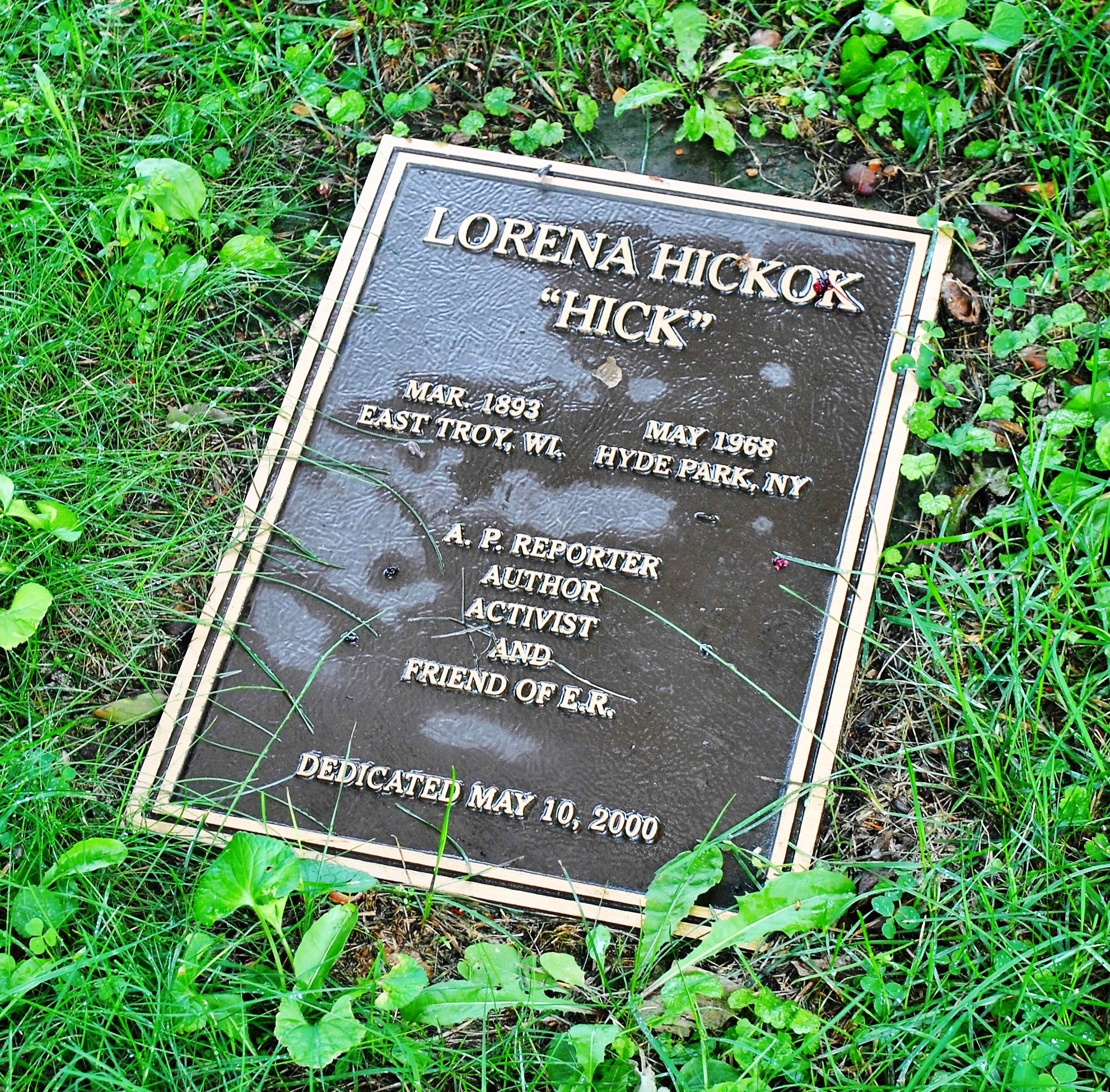
Hickock's grave in Rhinebeck Cemetery

Late in life, Hickok wrote several books. She co-authored Ladies of Courage with Eleanor Roosevelt in 1954. This was followed by The Story of Franklin D. Roosevelt (1956), The Story of Helen Keller (1958), The Story of Eleanor Roosevelt (1959), and several more.

Hickok willed her personal papers to the Franklin D. Roosevelt Presidential Library and Museum in Hyde Park, part of the US National Archives. Her donation was contained in eighteen filing boxes that, according to the provisions of her will, were to be sealed until ten years after her death. In early May 1978, Doris Faber, as part of research for a projected short biography of Eleanor Roosevelt, became perhaps the first person outside the National Archives to open these boxes, and was astounded to discover that they contained 2,336 letters from Roosevelt to Hickok, and 1,024 letters from Hickok to Roosevelt. Most of them dated to the 1930s, but the correspondence continued up to Roosevelt's 1962 death. Hickok's papers remain at the FDR Library and Museum, where they are available to the public.

Based on these letters, Terry Baum and Pat Bond wrote the play, Hick: A Love Story, the Romance of Lorena Hickok and Eleanor Roosevelt. In 2018, the novelist Amy Bloom published White Houses: A Novel about the relationship between Eleanor Roosevelt and Hickok. In an interview, Bloom stated what she wanted to examine: "...could it be like to be madly in love with someone who is married to your political hero? Lorena was, like Eleanor, not just a dyed-in-the-wool Democrat; she was a big FDR fan, which means her hero and friend was also her rival." Though the book was a novel, Bloom argued that many aspects of it such as Franklin Roosevelt approving of Eleanor's relationship with Hickok were based on fact as she argued: "There's no way that she was employed without Franklin's OK. And he obviously knew that she was in the White House in a bedroom adjoining his wife. I think to myself, You know, if my spouse had a lover in my house, even if it was a big house, I'm pretty sure I would notice. I'd assume the same was true for Franklin...And it was clear to me from Franklin's correspondence with other friends of Eleanor's, who were lesbian couples, that he was...I mean, he had, for a man of his background and personality, a sort of genial condescension, but also a lot of warmth and affection. I didn't think he would be threatened by Lorena." However, Bloom admitted that other aspects of her novel such as Hickok working in a circus were entirely of her own invention."
