= James I. Roosevelt =

American politician and jurist (1795–1875)

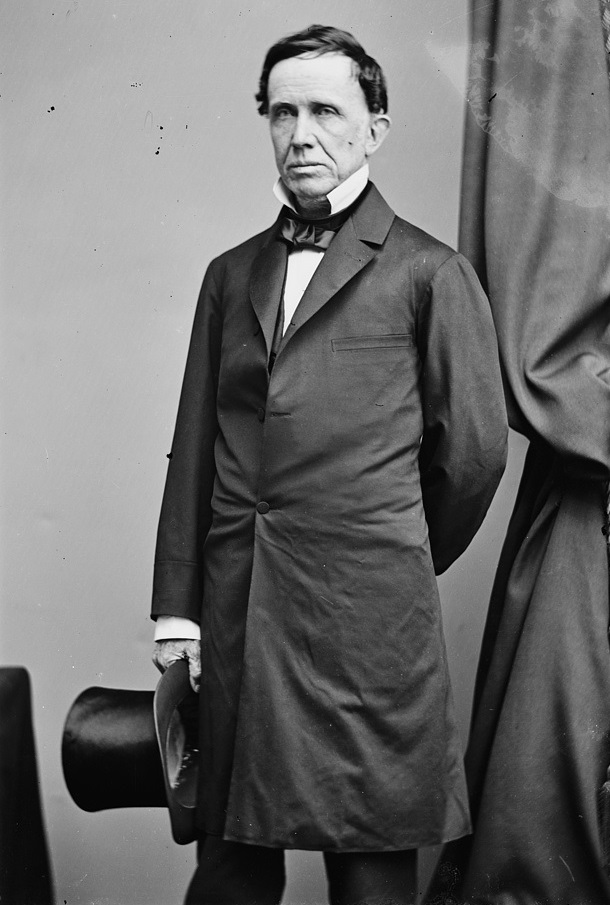
- Roosevelt, c. 1855–1865

United States Attorney for the Southern District of New York
- In office December 1860 – March 1861
- Preceded by: Theodore Sedgwick
- Succeeded by: Edward Delafield Smith

Member of the U.S. House of Representatives from New York's 3rd district
- In office March 4, 1841 – March 3, 1843
- Preceded by: Moses H. Grinnell; Edward Curtis; James Monroe; Ogden Hoffman
- Succeeded by: Jonas P. Phoenix

Member of the New York State Assembly from the New York district
- In office January 1, 1840 – December 31, 1840
- In office January 1, 1835 – December 31, 1835

Personal details
- Born: James John Roosevelt; December 14, 1795 New York City, New York, U.S.
- Died: April 5, 1875 (aged 79) New York City, New York, U.S.
- Party: Democratic Party
- Spouse: Cornelia Van Ness
- Children: 11
- Parent(s): James Jacobus Roosevelt; Maria Van Schaak
- Relatives: See Roosevelt family
- Education: Columbia College

James John Roosevelt, known as James I. (December 14, 1795 – April 5, 1875) was an American politician, jurist, businessman, and member of the Roosevelt family. From 1841 to 1843, he served one term in the U.S. House of Representatives.

== Early life ==
James I, the Roman numeral was used to distinguish him from others of the same name, was born on December 14, 1795, in New York City to James Jacobus Roosevelt (1759–1840) and Maria Van Schaak (1773–1845) and baptized at the Dutch Reformed Church. He was a great-grandson of Johannes Roosevelt, the founder of the Oyster Bay branch of the Roosevelt family. His brother Cornelius Roosevelt was the father of James A. Roosevelt, Robert Roosevelt, and Theodore Roosevelt, Sr. as well as paternal grandfather of President Theodore Roosevelt.

Roosevelt graduated from Columbia College in 1815 where he was a member of the Philolexian Society, and was admitted to the bar in 1818, becoming a partner of Peter Augustus Jay (son of John Jay), with a practice in New York City. Roosevelt owned slaves in his youth.

== Career ==
An active Democrat, he campaigned for Andrew Jackson for president in 1828. He was elected alderman in 1828 and 1830, was a member of the New York State Assembly in 1835 and 1840.

=== Congress ===
Roosevelt served in the United States House of Representatives from 1841 to 1843, but declined to seek reelection.

=== Later career ===
Roosevelt became a justice of the New York Supreme Court in 1851. He was for one term an ex officio judge of the State Court of Appeals. He also was a judge of the Superior Court of the City of New York. After James Parker Barnett, a student of French Creole heritage, had completed two of the three years of required lectures to obtain a degree from the Columbia University College of Physicians and Surgeons, a Southern student complained he was "colored" and Barnett was expelled from the institution. In 1853, Roosevelt ruled a writ issued by John W. Edmonds that ordered the institution to readmit Barnett to be invalid. From 1860 to 1861, he was the 15th U.S. District Attorney for Southern New York. He studied foreign law in the courts of England, the Netherlands, and France.

In business, Roosevelt followed in the tradition of his father as a hardware merchant. He engaged in farming after retiring. He was the first president of Roosevelt Hospital, which was founded by his cousin James H. Roosevelt.

== Personal life ==
On May 30, 1831, Roosevelt married Cornelia Van Ness (1810–1876) in Paris, the daughter of Governor of Vermont and the Collector of the Port of New York Cornelius P. Van Ness and Rhoda (née Savage) Van Ness, and the niece of William P. Van Ness and John Peter Van Ness. The American Revolution war hero, the Marquis de Lafayette, was among their guests. Among Cornelia's siblings were Marcia Van Ness (wife of British diplomat William Gore Ouseley) and James Van Ness, the Mayor of San Francisco. James and Cornelia were the parents of eleven children, all but three of whom died in childhood or early adulthood. Their children were:

- Mary Roosevelt (1832–1841), who died young.
- Cornelia Roosevelt (1833–1838), who died young.
- James Nicholas Roosevelt (1836–1856).
- John Van Ness Roosevelt (1838–1841), who died young.
- William Ouseley Roosevelt (1839–1841), who died young.
- Augustus Jay Roosevelt (1841–1842), who died young.
- Van Ness Roosevelt (1843-1872)
- Charles Yates Roosevelt (1846–1883), who married Cornelia (née Livingston) Talbot, a granddaughter of Robert Livingston (the 3rd Lord of Livingston Manor), and widow of James S. Talbot.
- Marcia Ouseley Roosevelt (1847–1906), who married Edward Brooks Scovel, an opera singer, in 1877. They were the parents of Frederick Roosevelt Scovel who married Vivien May Sartoris (1879–1933), a granddaughter of U.S. president Ulysses S. Grant.
- Frederick Roosevelt (1850–1916), who married Mary Loney (1850–1936).
- Matilda Roosevelt (1851–1854), who died young.

Roosevelt died on April 5, 1875, at his home, 836-838 Broadway in New York City, following complications sustained after he broke his thigh bone in a fall. He was buried in Greenwood Cemetery in Brooklyn, New York. Cornelia Roosevelt died in Paris on February 14, 1876.

Roosevelt's estate was worth in excess of US$2,000,000 (equivalent to $58,636,364 in 2025) at the time of his death, and left funds for his family and the family of his wife.

=== Descendants ===
His granddaughter, Cornelia Roosevelt, through his son Charles Yates Roosevelt, married Baron Clemens von Zedlitz of Prussia in 1889, who drowned in a collision with the German emperor's yacht in 1901. His daughter-in-law's nephew, David Bruce-Brown (1887–1912), was in the inaugural running of the Indianapolis 500 in 1911.

U.S. House of Representatives
| Preceded by Moses H. Grinnell; Edward Curtis; James Monroe; Ogden Hoffman | Member of the U.S. House of Representatives from New York's 3rd congressional district 1841–1843 with Charles G. Ferris, Fernando Wood, and John McKeon | Succeeded by Jonas P. Phoenix |
