= John Roosevelt =

John Roosevelt may refer to:

- John Roosevelt (c.1689–1750), colonial American politician, ancestor of President Theodore Roosevelt
- John Aspinwall Roosevelt (1916–1981), American businessman, son of President Franklin D. Roosevelt
- John Ellis Roosevelt (1853–1939), American lawyer, cousin of President Theodore Roosevelt

== See also ==
- John Roosevelt Boettiger (born 1939), American psychology professor and grandson of President Franklin D. Roosevelt
- Roosevelt family
