= George Emlen Roosevelt =

American politician (1887–1963)

- Born: October 13, 1887; New York City, New York
- Died: July 15, 1963 (aged 75); Oyster Bay, New York
- Education: St. Mark's School (1905)
- Alma mater: Harvard University (1909)
- Employer: Roosevelt & Son
- Spouse: Julia Morris Addison (m. 1914, divorced)
- Children: 4, including Julian
- Parent(s): William Emlen Roosevelt; Christine Griffin Kean
- Relatives: See Roosevelt family

George Emlen Roosevelt (October 13, 1887 – September 4, 1963) a banker and philanthropist, was a first cousin once-removed of U.S. President Theodore Roosevelt and one of the most prominent railroad financiers of his day, involved in no fewer than 14 railroad reorganizations. He also held directorships in several important companies, including the Morgan-controlled Guaranty Trust Company, the Chemical Bank, and the Bank for Savings in New York.

== Early life ==
He was the son of W. Emlen Roosevelt (1857–1930) and Christine Griffin Kean (1858–1936) and a direct descendant of Claes Martenszen Van Rosenvelt, who came from the Province of Zeeland in the Netherlands and emigrated to New Netherland in 1649. His paternal grandfather was James A. Roosevelt and his great-grandfather was Cornelius Van Schaack Roosevelt.

He was a graduate of St. Mark's School, class of 1905, and Harvard University, class of 1909. Roosevelt was a trustee of New York University for 35 years, the last 12 as chairman.

== Career ==
In 1908, George Emlen became a member of the family banking firm Roosevelt & Son. In January 1934, after the passage of FDR's Banking Act of 1933, the firm was split into three individual units: Roosevelt & Son, with which George Roosevelt remained as a senior partner, Dick & Merle-Smith, and Roosevelt & Weingold.

Mr. Roosevelt was a significant New York City philanthropist, serving as President and Director of the Chapin School, Vice-President of the Roosevelt Hospital, the New York Dispensary and New York University. Through the 1929–1935 period, he was President of the Metropolitan Club of New York, of which his father had been a Governor and Charter Member.

== Personal life ==
On October 24, 1914, he married Julia Morris Addison (1888–1937), the daughter of Rev. Charles Morris Addison (1856–1947) and Ada Thayer (1856–1934), and the sister of James Thayer Addison, in Stamford, Connecticut.

- Margaret Christine Roosevelt (1915–2003), who married Alessandro Pallavicini on May 29, 1935. After their divorce, she married George Philip Kent, Jr. on June 1, 1948.
- Medora Thayer Roosevelt (1917–1943), who married Herbert Whiting on December 18, 1936.
- George Emlen Roosevelt, Jr. (1918–1993), who married first, Nadine Ottilie Unger, and second, Marilyn Wood.
- Julian Kean Roosevelt (1924–1986), who married first, Florence Madeleine Graham, and second, Margaret Fay Schantz.

In 1937, after his wife's death, he married for the second time to Mildred Cobb Rich (1895–1979).

His son Julian Roosevelt also headed Roosevelt & Son, and was an Olympic yachtsman.

== See also ==
- Roosevelt family
