= Philip Roosevelt =

American WWI captain (1892–1941)

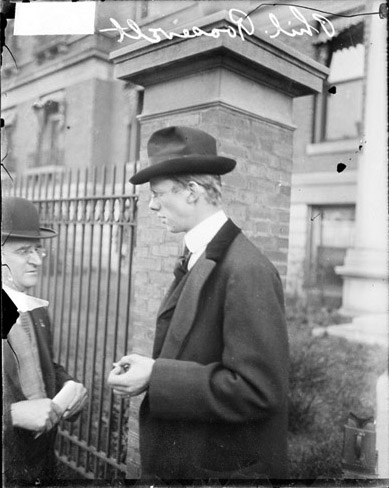
Philip Roosevelt, first cousin once removed of Theodore Roosevelt, standing at the gate outside Mercy Hospital where his cousin was taken after a 1912-10-14 assassination attempt (1912-10-15)

Philip James Roosevelt (May 15, 1892 – November 8, 1941) was a World War I captain for the United States Army, Aviation Section, U.S. Signal Corps (predecessor to the United States Air Force), editor of Aviation and Aeronautic Engineering (later known as Aviation Week, then Aviation Week & Space Technology), banker, yachtsman, and a cousin of United States President Theodore Roosevelt. Philip was close to the president's children and accompanied them on trips.

== Early life ==
Roosevelt was born on May 15, 1892. He was the youngest son of Emlen Roosevelt and Christine Griffin (née Kean) Roosevelt (1858–1936), His elder brother was George Emlen Roosevelt.

His maternal grandparents were Col. John Kean and Lucy (née Halsted) Kean (a daughter of Caleb O. Halsted, president of the Bank of the Manhattan Company). Among his extended family were uncles, John Kean and Hamilton Fish Kean, both of whom served as United States Senators from New Jersey.

He was a 1912 graduate of Harvard University. He served as the 1914 President of The Harvard Advocate.

=== Military service ===
Roosevelt was an original member of Raynal Bolling's 1st Aero Company of the New York National Guard. He did not qualify as a military aviator due to his eyesight, but as a military-aviation journalist he was a prominent aerial warfare expert. Immediately after United States Congress declared war on 6 April 1917, the Signal Corps summoned Roosevelt to Washington to help plan the aviation mobilization. He impressed Benjamin Delahauf Foulois and accompanied him to France. Foulois paired Roosevelt with major Bert Atkinson, but they had the command organization that resulted from the American Expeditionary Force’s inexperience in coalition warfare. They operated under the French Sixth Army, but two different American headquarters (including Colonel Billy Mitchell's 1st Air Brigade headquarters) felt that they held jurisdiction. The two planned America's first-ever air-land battle at a time when the US Army was still learning the nuances of command relationships between the pursuit and observation groups and the corps and armies they supported.

The Eighteenth Amendment to the United States Constitution was certified as ratified on January 29, 1919, and the National Prohibition Act, passed in the United States Congress over United States President Woodrow Wilson's veto on October 28, 1919. In November 1919, during prohibition, Roosevelt served as president of a joint venture with his cousins Theodore Roosevelt Jr., Kermit Roosevelt, Archibald Roosevelt, and Ethel Roosevelt Derby and her husband Richard Derby, opening a coffeehouse named the Brazilian Coffeehouse at 108 West 44th Street in Manhattan, New York. The coffeehouse was renamed the Double R, and moved to 112 W. 44th in 1921. It was managed by the Roosevelts until 1928.

=== Later life ===
He would later become partner in Roosevelt & Son and supposedly became a trustee of the estate of James Roosevelt, Sr. on behalf of distant cousin and United States President Franklin D. Roosevelt. A Time story of a repartee between cousins in a series of written notes about the effects of fiscal policy and estate interests was very humorous, but denied as false.

== Personal life ==
In 1925, he married his cousin Jean Schermerhorn Roosevelt (1891–1984), daughter of John Ellis Roosevelt. Their common great-grandfather, Cornelius Van Schaak Roosevelt, was Theodore Roosevelt's grandfather. Together, they were the parents of:

- Philippa Roosevelt (1926–1986), who married Benjamin Eustis Jeffries in 1958.
- Philip James Roosevelt Jr. (1928–1998), who married Philippa Buss, a daughter of Robert D. Buss of Edinburgh, Scotland, in 1969.
- John Ellis Roosevelt (1931–1985), who married Helen Catherine Daae Sparrow, a daughter of banker Edward Grant Sparrow, in 1959.

He died November 8, 1941 of drowning, presumably after a heart attack, while sailing a dinghy in Oyster Bay, New York.
