= Roosevelt family =

American business and political family

Roosevelt
- Political family
- Coat of arms of President Franklin D. Roosevelt
- Current region: New York and New England
- Earlier spellings: Rosevelt, van Rosenvelt, van Rosevelt
- Etymology: Dutch for "Rose field"
- Origin: Dutch American Community, English American Community—Netherlands, United Kingdom (England), United States (New York)
- Founded: c. 17th century
- Founder: Claes Martenszen van Rosenvelt, Nicholas Roosevelt
- Titles: List: President of the United States; First Lady of the United States; United States Vice President; Second Lady of the United States; Delegate to the United Nations; Governor (of New York, Puerto Rico); Governor-General of the Philippines; Archbishop of Baltimore (Bishop of Newark); United States Under Secretary of Commerce; Assistant Secretary of the Navy; Chair of the Equal Employment Opportunity Commission; Member of the U.S. House of Representatives (from New York, California); Member of Parliament (from the United Kingdom); State Representative (from Massachusetts, New York); Secretary of Commerce of Pennsylvania; First Lady of New York; Mayor (of Miami Beach, Florida, New York City); First Lady (from Farmington, Connecticut, New York City, Miami Beach, Florida); Long Beach, California City Councilmember; International Olympic Committee Member
- Connected families: Delano family; Du Pont family; Astor family; Latrobe family; Livingston family; Longworth family; Hoffman family; Schuyler family; Goodyear family; Lowell family; de Peyster family; Whitney family
- Estates: Sagamore Hill (Oyster Bay, New York); Springwood (Hyde Park, New York)

The Roosevelt family is an American political family and dynasty from New York whose members have included two United States presidents, a first lady, and various merchants, bankers, politicians, inventors, clergymen, artists, and socialites. The progeny of a mid-17th-century Dutch immigrant to New Amsterdam, many Roosevelts became nationally prominent in New York State and City politics and business and intermarried with prominent colonial families. Two distantly related branches of the family from Oyster Bay and Hyde Park, New York, rose to global political prominence with the presidencies of Theodore Roosevelt (1901–1909) and his fifth cousin Franklin D. Roosevelt (1933–1945), whose wife, First Lady Eleanor Roosevelt, was Theodore's niece. The Roosevelt family is one of four families to have produced two presidents of the United States by the same surname; the others were the Adams, Bush, and Harrison families.

== History ==
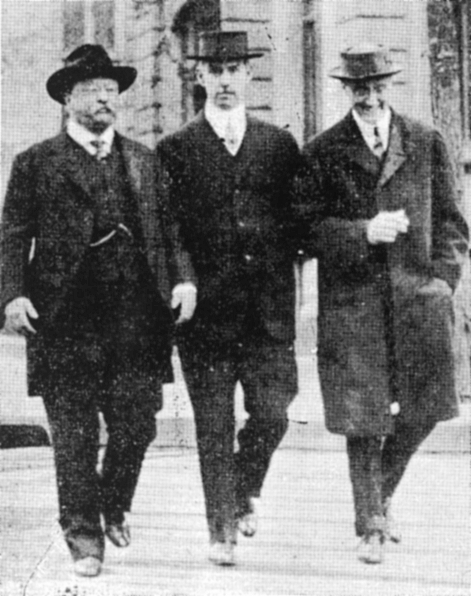
The only known photo of Theodore Roosevelt (left) with Franklin Delano Roosevelt (right), taken in 1915.

Claes Maartenszen van Rosenvelt (c. 1626–1679), the immigrant ancestor of the Roosevelt family, arrived in New Amsterdam (present-day New York City) sometime between 1638 and 1649. About the year 1652, he bought a farm from Lambert van Valckenburgh, comprising 24 morgens (i.e., 20.44 ha or 50.51 acres) in what is now Midtown Manhattan, including the present site of the Empire State Building. The property included approximately what is now the area between Lexington Avenue and Fifth Avenue, bounded by 29th St. and 35th St.

Claes van Rosenvelt's son Nicholas was the first to use the spelling Roosevelt and the first to hold political office, as an alderman. His sons Johannes and Jacobus are usually referred to as the progenitors of the Oyster Bay and Hyde Park branches of the family, though it was a more distant descendant of each who first moved to those locations, with some other descendants living elsewhere. By the late 19th century, the Hyde Park Roosevelts were generally associated with the Democratic Party and the Oyster Bay Roosevelts with the Republicans. President Theodore Roosevelt, an Oyster Bay Roosevelt, was the uncle of Eleanor Roosevelt, later wife of Franklin Roosevelt. Despite political differences that caused family members to actively campaign against each other, the two branches generally remained friendly.

The wife of Jacobus Roosevelt, whose name is recorded as Catharina Hardenbroek, is believed to be a member of the same family as Johannes Hardenbergh (1670–1748), the owner of a two million acre land patent in the Hudson Valley, New York.

In addition to his Roosevelt ancestors, Franklin Delano Roosevelt was a descendant of the following people and families:

- Wilhelmus Beekman, Mayor of New York City
- Richard Warren, Mayflower passenger
- John Howland, Mayflower passenger
- Anne Hutchinson, religious reformer
- William Walton, merchant (collateral descendant)
- Antoine Crispel, patentee of New Paltz, New York
- Maria Vigne, the first European child born at Fort Orange
- DeWitt family
- Hoffman family

== Coats of arms ==
Arms of the Roosevelt family
- Adopted: 17th century
- Crest: Upon a torse argent and gules, Three ostrich plumes each per pale gules and argent.
- Shield: Argent upon a grassy mound a rose bush proper bearing three roses Gules barbed and seeded proper..
- Motto: Qui plantavit curabit ("He who planted [us] will care [for us]")
- Other elements: The mantling, gules doubled argent.
- The Roosevelt arms feature a rose bush in reference to the name: "Roosevelt", which is Dutch for "rose field", making these an example of canting arms.

In heraldry, canting arms are a visual or pictorial depiction of a surname, and were and still are a popular practice. It would be common to find roses, then, in the arms of many Roosevelt families, even unrelated ones; the name Rosenvelt means "rose field". Also, grassy mounds or fields of green would be a familiar attribute.

The Van Roosevelts of Oud-Vossemeer in Zeeland have a coat of arms that is divided horizontally, the top portion green with a white chevron between three white roses, while the bottom half is gold with a red lion rampant. A traditional blazon suggested would be, Per fess vert a chevron between three roses argent and Or a lion rampant gules.

The coat of arms of the namesakes of the Dutch immigrant Claes van Rosenvelt, ancestor of the American political family that included Theodore and Franklin D. Roosevelt, was white with a rosebush with three rose flowers growing upon a grassy mound, the crest being of three ostrich feathers divided into red and white halves each. In heraldic terms this would be described as, Argent upon a grassy mound a rose bush proper bearing three roses gules barbed and seeded all proper, with a crest upon a torse argent and gules of Three ostrich plumes each per pale gules and argent. Franklin Roosevelt altered his arms to omit the rosebush and use in its place three crossed roses on their stems, changing the blazon of his shield to Three roses one in pale and two in saltire gules barbed seeded slipped and left proper.

== Members ==
Roosevelt family members
- Claes Martenszen van Rosenvelt (1623–1660), m. Jannetje Samuels Thomas (1625–1660)
  - Elsie Roosevelt (bap. 1652–1703), m. Hendrick Meyer, New York City assistant alderman. Descendants include Henry Rutgers, Revolutionary War hero and namesake of Rutgers University, Samuel Provoost, Bishop of the Episcopal Church, and Maria Provoost, wife of Mayor of New York City Cadwallader D. Colden.
  - Anna Margaret Roosevelt (1654–1706), m. Heyman A. Roosa (1643–1708)
  - Nicholas Roosevelt (1658–1742), m. Heyltje Jans Kunst (1664–1730)
    - Nicholas Roosevelt (b. 1687), goldsmith
      - Nicholas Roosevelt (b. 1715), first lieutenant of the Hearts of Oak militia in the American Revolutionary War
        - Nicholas Roosevelt (1758–1838), member of the New York Assembly from Warren County
          - Solomon Roosevelt (1778–1832)
            - Solomon Roosevelt (1807–1900), shipbuilder, built many steamships under the firm Roosevelt & Joyce, including the USS Morse. See Allaire Iron Works.
              - George Washington Roosevelt (1844–1907), Medal of Honor recipient for action at Bull Run, diplomat
    - Johannes Roosevelt (1689–1750)
      - Margreta Roosevelt (bap. 1709), m. William de Peyster, son of Mayor of New York City Johannes de Peyster
      - Nicholas Roosevelt (b. 1717), merchant
        - Nicholas Roosevelt (bap. 1740), New York City alderman
      - Cornelius Roosevelt (b. 1731), chocolate maker, New York City alderman
        - Cornelius C. Roosevelt (bap. 1755), merchant, New York City alderman, member of the New York State Assembly, m. Alida Fargie, granddaughter of Albany and New York City mayor Edward Holland
        - Maria Roosevelt (1760–1821), m. John Duffie
          - Matilda Duffie, m. Gerard De Peyster, New York City alderman
            - Margaret De Peyster, m. Philip Milledoler Brett, President of Rutgers University
          - Cornelius Roosevelt Duffie (1789–1827), Episcopal priest, founder and rector of Saint Thomas Church, m. Helena Bleecker, granddaughter of Anthony Lispenard Bleecker
            - Cornelius Roosevelt Duffie (1821–1900), first chaplain of Columbia College, founder and first rector of the Church of St. John the Baptist
        - Elbert Roosevelt (1767–1857), New York City merchant, early settler of Pelham Manor, New York, m. Jane Curtenius, daughter of merchant and politician Peter T. Curtenius
          - Clinton Roosevelt (1804–1898), politician and inventor
      - Jacobus Roosevelt (1724–1777)
        - Johannes Roosevelt (bap. 1751), m. Mary Schuyler of the Schuyler, Van Rensselaer, and Van Cortlandt families.
          - Mary Roosevelt (1789–1837), m. William Sheriff de Peyster, son of Pierre Guillaume de Peyster (himself a brother of Arent de Peyster)
        - Nicholas Roosevelt (1767–1854), inventor, m. Lydia Latrobe, daughter of architect Benjamin Henry Latrobe
          - Samuel Roosevelt (1813–1878)
            - Nicholas Latrobe Roosevelt (1847–1892)
              - Henry Latrobe Roosevelt (1879–1936), Assistant Secretary of the U.S. Navy, m. Eleanor Morrow, daughter of California judge and U.S. Representative William W. Morrow
                - Eleanor Katherine Roosevelt (1915–1995), m. Reverdy Wadsworth, son of U.S. Senator and Representative James W. Wadsworth Jr.
            - Samuel Montgomery Roosevelt (1858–1920), artist
        - James Jacobus Roosevelt (1759–1840), m. Maria Van Schaack (a descendant of the Schuyler family).
          - Cornelius Van Schaack Roosevelt Sr. (1794–1871), progenitor of the Oyster Bay Roosevelts (see below)
          - James John Roosevelt (1795–1875), politician, businessman and jurist, m. Cornelia Van Ness, daughter of Vermont politician Cornelius P. Van Ness
            - Marcia Ouseley Roosevelt (b. 1847), m. Edward Brooks Scovel, opera singer
              - Frederick Roosevelt Scovel, m. Vivien May Sartoris (1879–1933), daughter of Nellie Grant and granddaughter of President Ulysses S. Grant
          - Catherine Roosevelt (1803–1844), m. Michael Bourke
            - Margaret Jones Bourke, m. Thomas Edward Kenny, Canadian merchant, banker, and politician
            - Mary Louise Bourke (Marie-Louise) m. Henry Isaac Butterfield. Yorkshire Merchant and Business man
          - William Henry Roosevelt (1806–1869), politician, land speculator (Illinois)
    - James Jacobus Roosevelt (1692–1776), m. Catharina Hardenbroek
      - Helena Roosevelt (1719–1772), m. Andrew Barclay, namesake of Barclay Street in Manhattan
        - Charlotte Amelia Barclay (1760–1778), m. Richard Bayley, first professor of anatomy at Columbia College
          - Guy Carlton Bayley, m. Grace Roosevelt (see below)
            - James Roosevelt Bayley (1814–1877), Bishop of Newark and Archbishop of Baltimore
      - Christopher Roosevelt (b. 1739)
        - James Christopher Roosevelt (1770)
          - James Henry Roosevelt (1800–1863), founder of the Roosevelt Hospital
      - Isaac Roosevelt (1726–1794), merchant, co-founder of the Bank of New York, Federalist politician, served in the New York State Assembly and the New York Constitutional Convention, m. Cornelia Hoffman
        - Jacobus Roosevelt (1760–1847), m. Maria Walton, a descendant of Wilhelmus Beekman
          - Grace Roosevelt, m. Guy Carlton Bayley (see above)
          - Isaac Daniel Roosevelt (1790–1863), progenitor of the Hyde Park Roosevelts (see below)
        - Maria Roosevelt (b. 1763), m. Richard Varick, Mayor of New York City

=== Oyster Bay Roosevelts ===
Oyster Bay Roosevelts

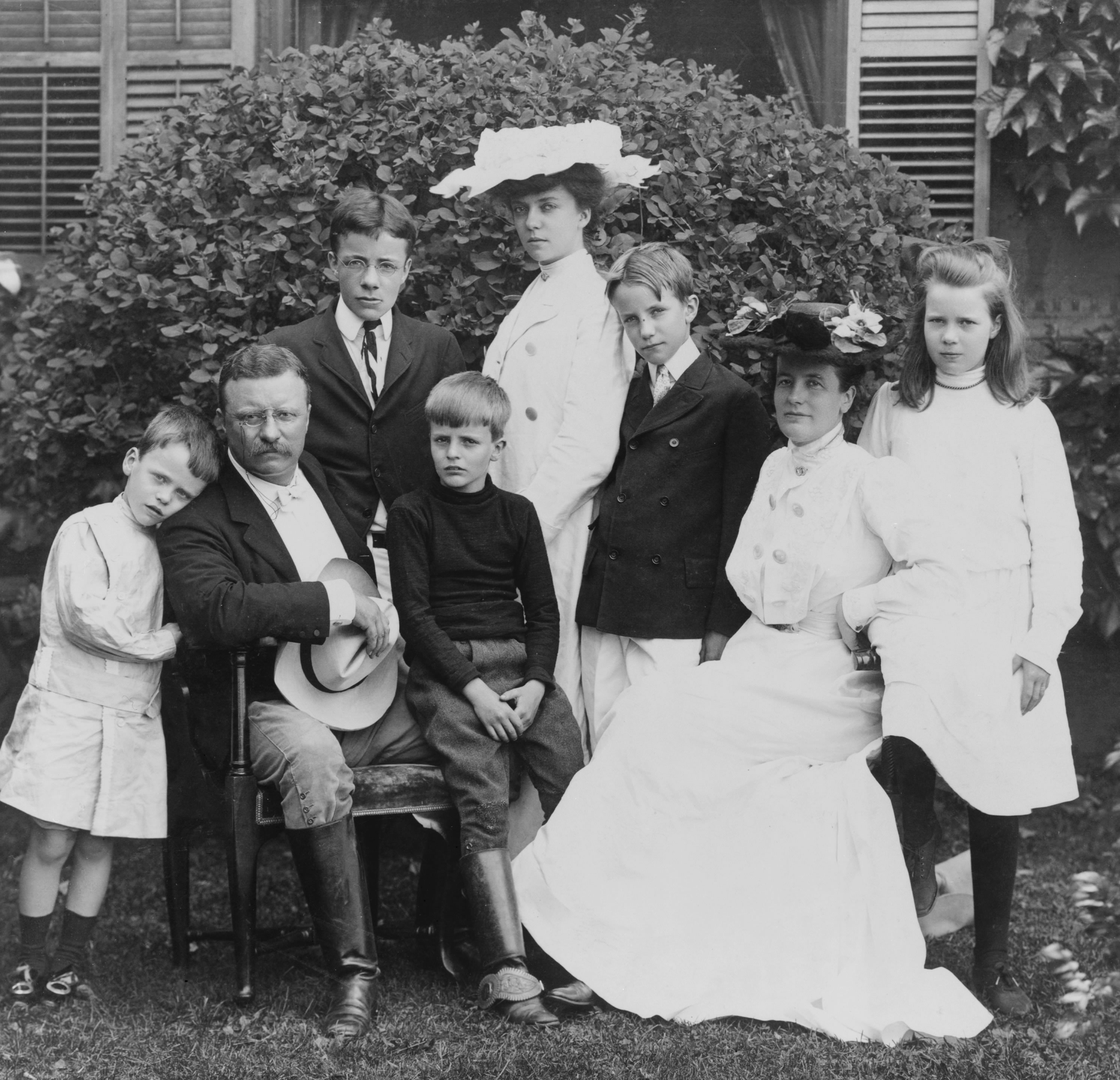
President Theodore Roosevelt and Edith Roosevelt seated on lawn, surrounded by their family in 1903. From left to right: Quentin, Theodore Jr., Theodore III, Archie, Alice, Kermit, Edith, and Ethel.

- Cornelius Van Schaack Roosevelt Sr. (1794–1871), co-founder of Chemical Bank
  - Silas Weir Roosevelt (1823–1870)
    - Cornelius Roosevelt (1847–1902), m. Anais Julia Carmencita Piorkque (1848–1941), m. Anastacia Anderpoll (1879–1962)
      - André Roosevelt (1879–1962), Olympic gold medalist and film director, m. Adelheid Lange (1879–1962), sculptor
      - Hilda Roosevelt (1881–1965), Parisian opera singer
    - Hilborne Roosevelt, (1849–1886), pioneering organ builder, m. Katherine Shippen
    - James West Roosevelt, (1858–1896), physician
      - Nicholas Roosevelt (1893–1982), American diplomat and journalist
  - James Alfred Roosevelt (1825–1898), banker
    - (James) Alfred Roosevelt (1856–1891), banker, m. Katherine Lowell, daughter of Massachusetts businessman and industrialist Augustus Lowell
      - Elfrida Roosevelt, m. Sir Orme Bigland Clarke, 4th Baronet, military officer
        - Sir Humphrey Clarke, 5th Baronet (1906–1973)
          - Sir Toby Clarke, 6th Baronet (1939–2019), British businessman
            - Theodora Roosevelt Clarke (1985–), United Kingdom parliamentarian
            - Sir Lawrence Clarke, 7th Baronet (1990–), Olympic hurdler and investment banker
    - William Emlen Roosevelt (1857–1930), banker and telegraph executive, m. 1883, Christine Griffin Kean, daughter of Col. John Kean and sister of John and Hamilton Fish Kean
      - George Emlen Roosevelt (1887–1963), banker and philanthropist
        - Julian Roosevelt (1924–1986), Olympic gold medalist and IOC member
      - Philip James Roosevelt Sr. (1892–1941), U.S. Army captain during World War I and banker, m. his second cousin Jean S. Roosevelt (see below)
  - Cornelius Van Schaack Roosevelt Jr.
  - Robert Barnwell Roosevelt (1829–1906), conservationist, m. 1st Elizabeth Ellis, m. 2nd Minnie O'Shea
    - John Ellis Roosevelt (1853–1939), m. Nannie Vance, daughter of New York City politician Samuel B. H. Vance
      - Jean Schermerhorn Roosevelt, m. her second cousin Philip James Roosevelt Sr. (see above)
    - Granville Roland Fortescue (1875–1952), soldier and war correspondent, m. Grace Hubbard Bell, niece of Alexander Graham Bell
      - Thalia Massie (1911–1963), whose rape was the subject of the 1932 Massie Trial
      - Helene Whitney (1914–1990) (born Kenyon Fortescue), 1930s and 1940s film actress, m. Julian Louis Reynolds, son of Richard S. Reynolds Sr. and heir to the Reynolds tobacco and aluminum fortunes
  - Theodore Roosevelt Sr. (1831–1878), m. Martha "Mittie" Bulloch
    - Anna "Bamie/Bye" Roosevelt (1855–1931), m. William Sheffield Cowles Sr.
      - William Sheffield Cowles Jr. (1898–1986), Connecticut State Representative, Mayor of Farmington, Connecticut
    - Theodore "T.R." Roosevelt Jr. (1858–1919), 1st m. Alice Hathaway Lee, 2nd m. Edith Kermit Carow, 5th Assistant Secretary of the Navy, 33rd Governor of New York, 25th Vice President of the United States, and 26th President of the United States
      - Alice Lee Roosevelt (1884–1980), m. Nicholas Longworth IV
        - Paulina Longworth (1925–1957) (daughter with William Edgar Borah), m. Alexander McCormick Sturm
          - Joanna Mercedes Alessandra Sturm (b. 1946)
      - Theodore "Ted" Roosevelt III (1887–1944), m. Eleanor Butler Alexander
        - Grace Green Roosevelt (1911–1994), m. William McMillan
        - Theodore Roosevelt IV (1914–2001), m. Anne Mason Babcock
          - Theodore Roosevelt V (b. 1942), m. Constance Lane Rogers
            - Theodore Roosevelt VI (b. 1976), m. Serena Clare Torrey
              - Theodore Roosevelt VII
        - Cornelius Van Schaack Roosevelt III (1915–1991)
        - Quentin Roosevelt II (1919–1948), m. Frances Blanche Webb
          - Anna Curtenius Roosevelt (b. 1946), archaeologist
          - Susan Roosevelt, m. William Weld
          - Alexandra Roosevelt
      - Kermit Roosevelt Sr. (1889–1943), m. Belle Wyatt Willard
        - Kermit Roosevelt Jr. (changed to Sr. on father's death) (1916–2000), m. Mary Lowe Gaddis
          - Kermit Roosevelt III (changed to Jr. on grandfather's death)
            - Kermit Roosevelt IV (b. 1971, changed to III on great-grandfather's death), law professor and writer
          - Mark Roosevelt (b. 1955), President of St. John's College
        - Joseph Willard Roosevelt (1918–2008), pianist and composer
        - Belle Wyatt "Clochette" Roosevelt (1920–1985), m. John Gorham Palfrey Jr., great-grandson of Massachusetts congressman John G. Palfrey
          - Sean Palfrey m. Judith Sullivan
            - John Palfrey (b. 1972), law professor and Head of School at Phillips Academy
            - Quentin Palfrey (b. 1974)
            - Katy Palfrey
      - Ethel Carow Roosevelt (1891–1977), m. Richard Derby
        - Edith Roosevelt Derby (1917–2008), historian and conservationist
        - Sarah Alden Derby (1920–1999), m. Vermont State Senator Robert T. Gannett
      - Archibald Bulloch "Archie" Roosevelt Sr. (1894–1979), m. Grace Lockwood, municipal bond broker
        - Archibald Bulloch Roosevelt Jr. (1918–1990), CIA officer, 1st m. Katherine Tweed, 2nd m. Selwa Carmen Showker
          - Tweed Roosevelt (b. 1942), businessman
        - Theodora Roosevelt (1919–2008), novelist, m. Tom Keogh
        - Nancy Dabney Roosevelt (1923–2010), m. William Eldred Jackson, son of jurist Robert H. Jackson
          - Melissa Jackson (b. 1952), jurist and lawyer
          - Melanie Jackson, literary agent, m. Thomas Pynchon
        - Edith Kermit Roosevelt (1926–2003), newspaper columnist, m. Alexander Gregory Barmine
          - Margot Roosevelt (b. 1950), journalist, m. Ralph Hornblower III
            - Samuel Roosevelt Hornblower (b. 1978), Emmy Award winning producer of 60 Minutes
      - Quentin Roosevelt I (1897–1918), killed in World War I
    - Elliott Roosevelt (1860–1894), m. Anna Rebecca Hall, a descendant of the Livingston family
      - Anna Eleanor Roosevelt (1884–1962), First Lady of the United States, delegate to the United Nations, m. Franklin Delano Roosevelt Sr.
      - Elliott Roosevelt Jr. (1889–1893)
      - Gracie Hall Roosevelt (1891–1941), 1st m. Margaret Richardson, 2nd m. Dorothy Kemp
    - Corinne Roosevelt (1861–1933), m. Douglas Robinson, poet, lecturer, and orator
      - Theodore Douglas Robinson (1883–1934) m. Helen Rebecca Roosevelt
        - Douglas Robinson (1906–1964), m. Louise Miller, daughter of New York Governor Nathan L. Miller
        - Elizabeth Mary Douglas Robinson (1909–1979), m. Jacques Blaise de Sibour, son of architect Jules Henri de Sibour
      - Corinne Douglas Robinson (1886–1971), twice elected to the Connecticut House of Representatives, m. Joseph Wright Alsop IV
        - Joseph Wright Alsop V (1910–1989), journalist and syndicated newspaper columnist
        - Corinne Roosevelt Alsop (1912–1997), m. Percy Chubb II, grandson of the founder of Chubb Limited
        - Stewart Johonnot Oliver Alsop Sr. (1914–1974), American newspaper columnist and political analyst
          - Joseph Wright Alsop VI, software executive and venture capitalist
          - Ian Alsop
          - Elizabeth Winthrop Alsop (b. 1948), children's book author,
          - Stewart Johonnot Oliver Alsop Jr. (b. 1952), investor and pundit
          - Richard Nicholas Alsop, missionary with FamilyLife
          - Andrew Alsop
        - John deKoven Alsop (1915–2000), insurance executive and Connecticut state legislator
      - Monroe Douglas Robinson (1887–1944)
      - Stewart Douglas Robinson (1889–1909), committed suicide by jumping from his college dormitory window after a party.

=== Hyde Park Roosevelts ===
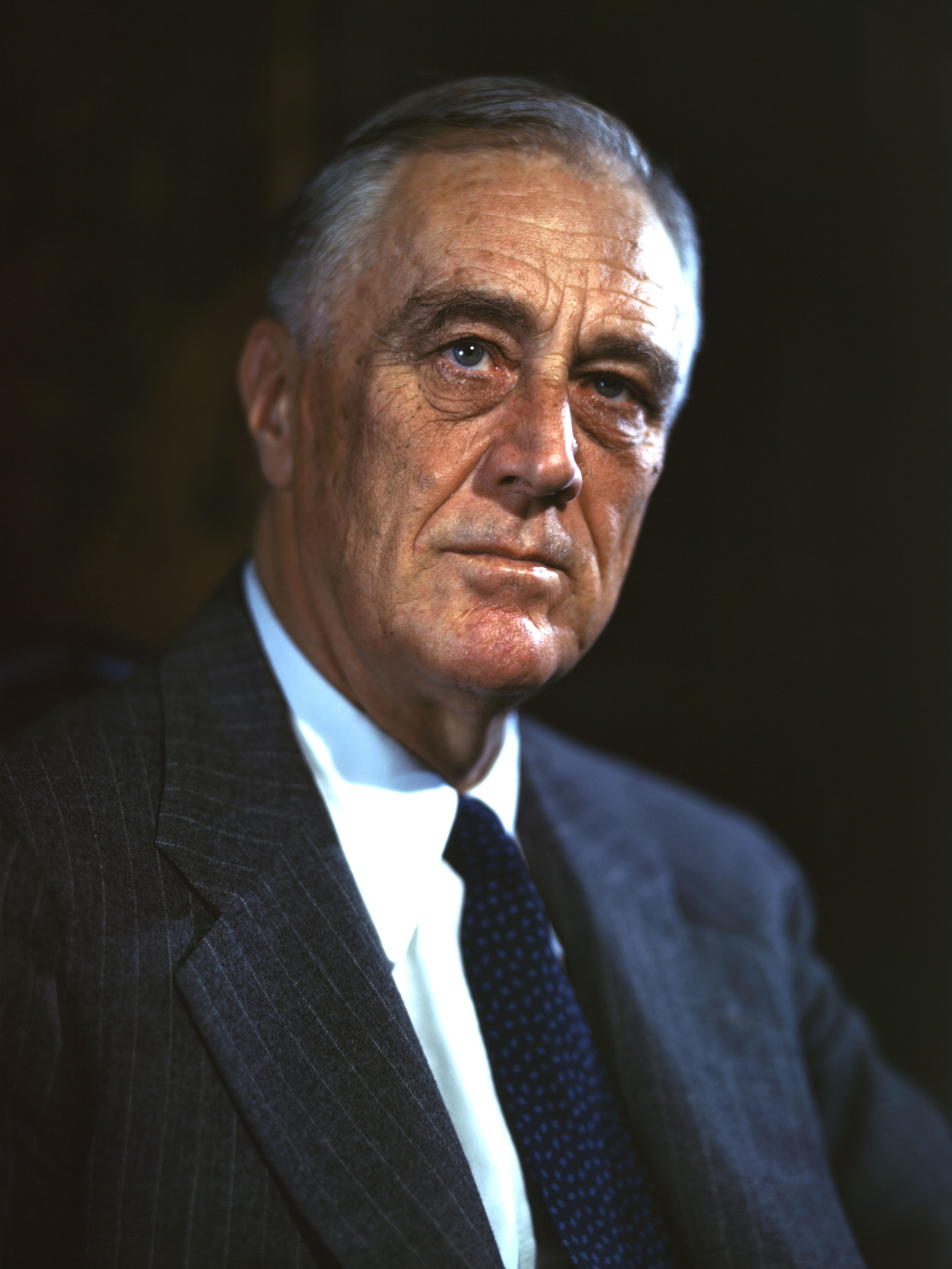
Franklin Delano Roosevelt

Hyde Park Roosevelts
- Isaac Daniel Roosevelt (1790–1863) m. Mary Rebecca Aspinwall, daughter of Susan Howland and John Aspinwall, and a descendant of Rev. John Lothrop
  - James Roosevelt I (1828–1900), 1st m. Rebecca Howland, 2nd m. Sara Ann Delano
    - James Roosevelt "Rosey" Roosevelt (1854–1927) m. Helen Schermerhorn Astor
      - Helen Rebecca Roosevelt (1881–1962), m. Theodore Douglas Robinson (see above)
      - James Roosevelt "Tadd" Roosevelt Jr. (1879–1958)
    - Franklin Delano Roosevelt (1882–1945), m. Anna Eleanor Roosevelt, 12th Assistant Secretary of the Navy, 44th Governor of New York and 32nd President of the United States
      - Anna Eleanor Roosevelt (1906–1975), m. 1st Curtis Bean Dall, m. 2nd Clarence John Boettiger, m. 3rd Dr. James Addison Halsted
        - Anna Eleanor Roosevelt Dall (b. 1927) m. Van H. Seagraves 1948
          - Nicholas Delano Seagraves (b. 1949)
          - David Delano Seagraves (b. 1952)
          - Anna Eleanor Seagraves (b. 1955)
        - Curtis Roosevelt Dall (1930–2016)
        - John Roosevelt Boettiger (b. 1939), m. Leigh McCullough
      - James Roosevelt II (1907–1991), m. 1st Betsy Cushing, m. 2nd Romelle Schneider, m. 3rd Irene Owens, m. 4th Mary Winskill
        - Sara Delano Roosevelt, (1932–2021), m. pianist Anthony di Bonaventura
        - Kate Roosevelt (1936–2002), m. journalist and politician William Haddad
        - James Roosevelt III (b. 1945), attorney and Democratic Party official, m. Ann Martha Conlon
          - Kathleen Ann Roosevelt (b. 1978), m. Jeffrey Walker
          - Theresa Marie Roosevelt (b. 1982), m. Robert O'Loughlin
          - Maura Amy Roosevelt (b. 1984), m. Joshua Fisher
        - Michael Anthony Roosevelt (1946-2002)
        - Anna Eleanor Roosevelt (b. 1948)
        - Hall Delano Roosevelt (b. 1959), served on the Long Beach, California City Council in the 1990s
        - Rebecca Mary Roosevelt (b. 1971)
      - Franklin Roosevelt (1908–1909), died in infancy
      - Elliott Roosevelt Sr. (1910–1990), United States Army Air Forces officer and author, m. 1st Emily Browning Donner, daughter of businessman William Donner, m. 2nd Ruth Josephine Googins, m. 3rd Faye Margaret Emerson, m. 4th Minnewa Bell, m. 5th Patricia Peabody
        - William Donner Roosevelt (1932–2003), investment banker and philanthropist
        - Ruth Chandler Roosevelt (1934–2018)
        - Elliott Roosevelt Jr. (b. 1936), Texas oilman
        - David Boynton Roosevelt (b. 1942)
        - Livingston Delano Roosevelt (b. 1962, died as an infant)
      - Franklin Delano Roosevelt Jr., lawyer, politician, and businessman (1914–1988), m. 1st Ethel du Pont, m. 2nd Suzanne Perrin, m. 3rd Felicia Schiff Warburg Sarnoff, m. 4th Patricia Luisa Oakes, m. 5th Linda McKay Stevenson Weicker
        - Franklin Delano Roosevelt III (b. 1938), economist, m. Grace R. Goodyear, great-granddaughter of businessman Charles W. Goodyear and great-granddaughter of inventor and manufacturer Thomas Robins
          - Phoebe Louisa Roosevelt (b. 1965)
          - Nicholas Martin Roosevelt (b. 1966) (twin)
          - Amelia Roosevelt (b. 1966) (twin), concert violinist
        - Christopher du Pont Roosevelt (b. 1941) m. Rosalind Havemeyer, a great-granddaughter of sugar refiner Henry Osborne Havemeyer
        - John A. Roosevelt
        - Nancy Roosevelt Ireland
        - Laura Delano Roosevelt, m. Charles Henry Silberstein
      - John Aspinwall Roosevelt II (1916–1981), m. Anne Lindsay Clark
        - Haven Clark Roosevelt (b. 1940)
        - Anne Sturgis Roosevelt (b. 1942)
        - Sara Delano Roosevelt (1946–1960); killed in a horseback-riding accident
        - Joan Lindsay Roosevelt (1952–1997)
  - John Aspinwall Roosevelt (1840–1909), m. Ellen Murray Crosby
    - Grace Walton Roosevelt (1867–1945), tennis player, m. Appleton LeSure Clark
      - Roosevelt Clark (1897–1928)
      - Russell Clark (1900–1967)
    - Ellen Crosby Roosevelt (1868–1954), tennis champion

== Businesses ==
The following is a list of companies in which the Roosevelt family have held a controlling or otherwise significant interest.

- Bank of New York
- Central & South American Telegraph Company
- Chemical Bank
- Roosevelt Automobile Company
- Roosevelt China Investments Corporation
- Roosevelt & Cross
- Roosevelt Investment Group
- Roosevelt, Joyce & Company
- Roosevelt & Kobbe
- Roosevelt Organ Works
- Roosevelt & Sargent
- Roosevelt & Son
- Somerset Imports
- Texas State Network
- United States Lines

== Charities, museums and nonprofit organizations ==
- The Alliance, Inc.
- American Museum of Natural History
- Boone and Crockett Club
- Bull Moose Party
- Children's Aid Society
- Committee of Seventy (New York City)
- Metropolitan Museum of Art
- National Committee for an Effective Congress
- National Committee to Preserve Social Security and Medicare
- Roosevelt Hospital
- Roosevelt Institute
- Theodore Roosevelt Association
- Val-Kill Industries
- St. James Episcopal Church, Hyde Park, NY

== See also ==
- The Roosevelts: An Intimate History – 2014 television documentary miniseries
