= James Jacobus Roosevelt =

American businessman (1759–1840)

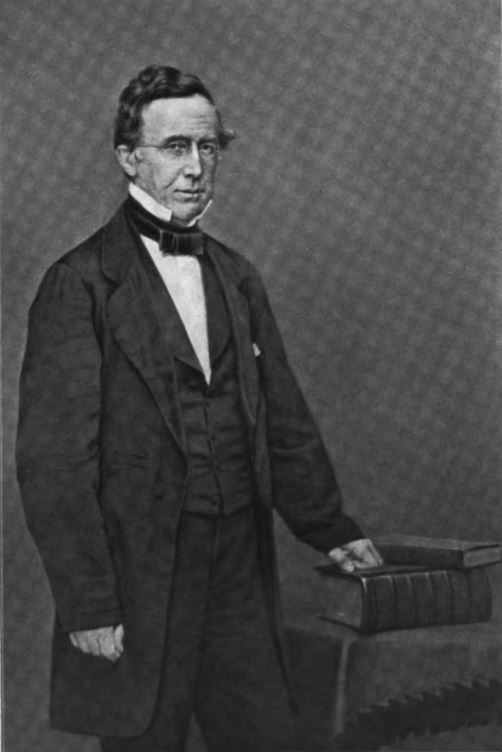
- Born: October 25, 1759; New York City, New York, British America
- Died: August 13, 1840 (aged 80); New York City, U.S.
- Occupation: Businessman
- Spouse: Maria Van Schaack (m. 1793)
- Children: 3, including Cornelius and James
- Relatives: See Roosevelt family

James Jacobus Roosevelt (October 25, 1759 – August 13, 1840) was an American businessman from New York City who was a member of the Roosevelt family.

== Early life ==
Roosevelt was born on October 25, 1759, in New York City. He was the sixth of seven children born to Jacobus James Roosevelt (1724–1777) and Annetje Bogert (1728–1773). His paternal grandfather was Johannes Roosevelt (1689–1750), the founder of the Oyster Bay branch of the Roosevelt family. His father was a first cousin of Isaac Roosevelt (1726–1794), a patrilineal great-great-grandfather of President Franklin Delano Roosevelt.

== Career ==
During the American Revolutionary War, Roosevelt was a commissary for the troops in New York.

In 1818, after his son Cornelius left Columbia College, Cornelius became his partner in importing hardware, and at Cornelius' insistence, the focus of the business changed from hardware to plate glass.

On February 28, 1835, due to the fact that he was a native or resident of what is now the City or State of New York prior to the year 1785, his son James was elected a member of the Saint Nicholas Society of the City of New York, upon its inception. His son served as president of the Society in 1862 and 1864.

== Personal life ==
On March 8, 1793, he married Maria Helen Van Schaak (1773–1845), the daughter of Cornelius Van Schaack Jr. (1734–1797), and the niece of Peter van Schaack (1747–1832). Her paternal grandparents were Cornelius Van Schaack (1705–1776) and Lydia Van Dyck (1704–1785). Her great-grandmother, Lydia's mother, was Maria Schuyler (1666–1742), of the prominent Schuyler family, who was the daughter of Catharina Verplanck (1639–1690) and David Pieterse Schuyler (1636–1690), who died in 1690 as a result of the Schenectady massacre of 1690, and the niece of Philip Pieterse Schuyler (1628–1683), an early Dutch-American settler. Together, they had two surviving sons and one surviving daughter:

- Cornelius Van Schaack Roosevelt (1794–1871), a businessman and real estate investor. In 1821, he married Margaret Barnhill (1799–1861), a daughter of Robert Craig Barnhill.
- James John Roosevelt (1795–1875), who served as a United States Congressman from New York from 1841 until 1843. In 1831, he married Cornelia Van Ness (1810–1876), the daughter of Cornelius Van Ness (1782–1852) and the niece of William P. Van Ness and John Peter Van Ness.
- Catherine Angelica Roosevelt (1803–1844).

On August 13, 1840, Roosevelt died. Upon his death, he bequeathed a large fortune to his children, making his son Cornelius one of the five richest men in New York City.

=== Descendants ===
Roosevelt's great-grandchildren include Theodore Roosevelt (1858–1919), the future President of the United States, John Ellis Roosevelt (1853–1939), William Emlen Roosevelt (1857–1930), and Granville Roland Fortescue (1875–1952), an author and soldier.
