= Theodore Roosevelt I =

Theodore Roosevelt I may refer to:

- Theodore Roosevelt Sr. (1831–1878), American businessman and philanthropist
- Theodore Roosevelt (1858–1919), 26th president of the United States
