= Senator Gannett =

Senator Gannett may refer to:

- Barzillai Gannett (1764–1832), Massachusetts State Senate
- Robert T. Gannett (1917–2012), Vermont State Senate
