= Emlen Roosevelt =

American banker (1857–1930)

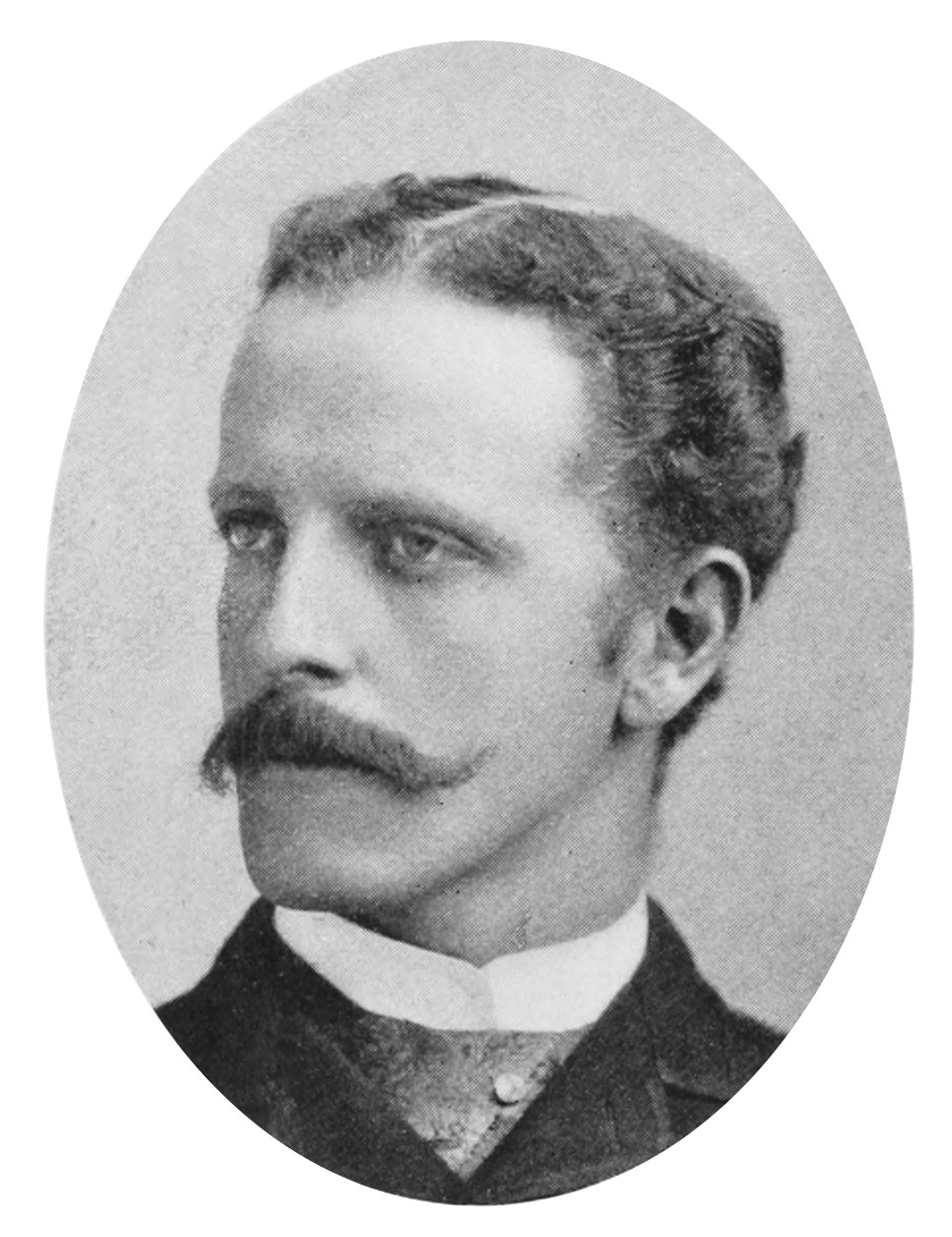
- Born: William Emlen Roosevelt; April 30, 1857; New York City, New York
- Died: May 15, 1930 (aged 73); New York City, New York
- Employer: Roosevelt & Son
- Spouse: Christine Griffin Kean (m. 1883)
- Children: 5, including George, Philip
- Parent(s): James A. Roosevelt; Elizabeth Norris Emlen
- Relatives: See Roosevelt family

William Emlen Roosevelt (April 30, 1857 – May 15, 1930) was a prominent New York City banker who held a wide range of positions in numerous organizations and was a cousin of United States President Theodore Roosevelt. He was president of Roosevelt & Son, the banking firm founded by his father James Alfred Roosevelt.

== Early life ==
William Emlen Roosevelt was born to James Alfred Roosevelt and Elizabeth Norris Emlen. His maternal grandparents were William Fishbourne Emlen (1786–1866) and Mary Parker Norris (1791–1872) and his paternal grandparents were Cornelius Van Schaack Roosevelt (1794–1871) and Margaret Barnhill (1799–1861).

== Career ==
He was director of the Chemical Bank of New York, the Gallatin National Bank, and the Astor National Bank, and later sat on the boards of the Grand Hanover and the Bank of New York. He was president of Roosevelt Hospital, founded by his distant cousin James H. Roosevelt. He was an officer of the National Guard for 16 years, major and quartermaster of the First Brigade. Roosevelt became involved in telecommunications companies, formed the Mexican Telegraph Company and Central and South American Telegraph Company, and was eventually director of the International Telephone and Telegraph Company.

Theodore Roosevelt and he had a very close relationship as cousins. Emlen was not interested in politics other than to support his cousin's bids for public office, and Theodore, busy with conservation advocacy, had little time to attend to financial matters. Thus, "Cousin Emlen" was Theodore's financial adviser before, during and after his presidency.

== Personal life ==
In 1883, he married Christine Griffin Kean (1858–1936), a daughter of Col. John Kean and Lucy (née Halsted) Kean, who was the sister of John Kean and Hamilton Fish Kean, both of whom served as United States Senators from New Jersey. They were the parents of:

- Christine Kean Roosevelt (1884–1913), who married James Etter Shelley (1871–1936), in 1909.
- George Emlen Roosevelt (1887–1963), who married Julia Morris Addison (1888–1937), the sister of James Thayer Addison in 1914. After her death, he married Mildred Cobb Rich (1895–1979).
- Lucy Margaret Roosevelt (1888–1914), who died of typhoid after a trip in South America.
- John Kean Roosevelt (1889–1974), who married Elise Annette Weinacht (1896–1972) in 1916.
- Philip James Roosevelt (1892–1941), who married his cousin, Jean S. Roosevelt, the daughter of John Ellis Roosevelt, in 1925.

He also owned the James Alfred Roosevelt Estate at Cove Neck in Nassau County, New York.

Emlen, together with Christine Roosevelt, donated land to establish the Theodore Roosevelt Sanctuary and Audubon Center in Oyster Bay, New York in 1923.

Roosevelt died at his home, 804 Fifth Avenue in New York City, on May 15, 1930, at the age of 73. His funeral was held at St. Thomas' Church.

== See also ==
- Roosevelt family
