= James Alfred Roosevelt Estate =

Historic house in New York, United States

- U.S. National Register of Historic Places
- Location within New York Location within the United States
- Location: 360 Cove Neck Rd., Cove Neck, New York
- Coordinates: 40°53′2″N 73°30′29″W
- Area: 12.2 acres (4.9 ha)
- Built: 1881
- Architect: Price, Bruce
- Architectural style: Shingle Style
- NRHP reference No.: 79001592
- Added to NRHP: May 17, 1979

James Alfred Roosevelt Estate, also known as Yellowbanks, is a historic estate located at Cove Neck in Nassau County, New York. It is located several hundred feet west of Sagamore Hill, home of President Theodore Roosevelt. It was designed by architect Bruce Price (1845-1903) in 1881 as a summer home for James A. Roosevelt (1825-1898), uncle to Theodore Roosevelt. It is a Shingle Style house, basically rectangular in massing, two and a half to three stories in height with a gambrel roof. The home was occupied by Emlen Roosevelt (1857-1930).

It was listed on the National Register of Historic Places in 1979.
