= Julian Roosevelt =

American sailor & banker (1924–1986)

- Born: Julian Kean Roosevelt; March 27, 1924; Manhattan, New York City, U.S.
- Died: November 14, 1986 (aged 62); Manhasset, New York, U.S.
- Other name: Dooley
- Education: Philips Exeter (1943)
- Alma mater: Harvard University (1950)
- Spouses: Florence Madeleine Graham (m. 1946; div. 1955) Margaret Fay Schantz (m. 1957)
- Children: 4
- Parent: George Emlen Roosevelt
- Relatives: See Roosevelt family

Medal record

Men's sailing

Representing United States

Olympic Games
Gold medal – first place	1952 Helsinki	Men's 6-meter class

Julian "Dooley" Kean Roosevelt (November 14, 1924 – March 27, 1986) was an American banker and Olympic yachtsman who was a member of the Roosevelt family.

== Early life ==
Roosevelt was born on November 14, 1924, to George Emlen Roosevelt and Julia Morris Addison, the sister of James Thayer Addison. Through his father he was a first cousin twice removed of U.S. President Theodore Roosevelt. Roosevelt attended Philips Exeter (1943) and later, Harvard University, where he participated in crew.

== Career ==
From 1942 to 1946, he served in the United States Coast Guard, and was discharged from the Army Reserve Field Artillery in 1955 after 8 years of active reserve duty.

He participated in the 1948 Olympics and became a gold medalist in the 1952 Olympics in the 6-meter class, he was later a member of the International Olympic Committee who advocated removing political motives from the games, criticizing the U.S. boycott of the 1980 Moscow Olympics and the banning of South African athletes.

After the Olympics, he became a partner of Dick & Merle Smith, an investment brokerage firm in New York City that was created as part of the break-up of Roosevelt & Son due to the passage of the Glass–Steagall Act in 1934. He also served as a trustee of the Union Square Savings Bank and was a director of Fundamental Investors, Inc., also in New York. He later served as a vice president of Sterling Grace & Company.

== Personal life ==
He was twice married, first in 1946 in Providence, Rhode Island, to Florence Madeleine Graham (d. 1991), the daughter of E. W. Sterling Graham of Pittsburgh, and was descended from William Bradford, the 2nd Governor of Plymouth Colony. Before their divorce in 1955, they had three children together:

- Nicholas Paul Roosevelt (b. 1949)
- George Emlen Roosevelt III (b. 1951)
- Robin Addison Roosevelt (1954–1999)

After their divorce in 1955, she married later that same year to Eric Ridder (1918–1996), the publisher of The Journal of Commerce, who also won the gold medal in sailing with Julian in 1952. Roosevelt married second to Margaret Fay Schantz, who was also divorced, from Donald William Scholle, in 1957. She was the daughter of Dr. Charles W. Schantz and was an alumna of the Masters School in Dobbs Ferry, New York. Together, they had:

- Fay Satterfield Roosevelt (b. 1959), who married Julian Potter Fisher II, in 1985.

In March 1957, his mansion on Center Island on Long Island, New York, was ruined by a fire.

Roosevelt died of liver cancer on March 27, 1986, at Glen Cove Hospital in Manhasset, New York, not far from his home in Oyster Bay.
