= Nicholas Roosevelt (1658–1742) =

Dutch–American colonial alderman (1658–1742)

Alderman of New York City
- In office 1715
- In office 1698–1701

Personal details
- Born: Nicholas van Rosenvelt; October 2, 1658 New Amsterdam, New Netherland
- Died: July 30, 1742 (aged 83) New York City, Province of New York
- Spouse: Heyltje Jans Kunst (m. 1682; died 1730)
- Relations: See Roosevelt family
- Children: 10, including Johannes Roosevelt
- Parent(s): Claes Maartenszen van Rosenvelt; Jannetje Samuels Thomas
- Occupation: Politician

Nicholas Roosevelt (born Nicholas van Rosenvelt) (bap. October 2, 1658 – died July 30, 1742) was an American politician. He was an early member of the Roosevelt family and a prominent Dutch-American citizen of New Amsterdam (later New York City), and was the 4th great-grandfather to Theodore Roosevelt (1858–1919) and Franklin Delano Roosevelt (1882–1945). He was the first Roosevelt to hold an elected office in North America, as an alderman, as well as the first to use the familiar spelling of the family name.

== Early life ==
Roosevelt was born in New Amsterdam and baptized on October 2, 1658. He was the son of Claes Maartenszen van Rosenvelt (c. 1626–1659), the immigrant ancestor of the Roosevelt family in America, and Jannetje Samuels Thomas (1625–1660). He was baptized in the Reformed Dutch Church of New Amsterdam.

== Life and career ==
By 1680, he had moved to Esopus, near Kingston, another early Dutch settlement in the New Netherlands. There, on April 5, 1680, he signed a petition asking for a minister for Kingston. During his time in Esopus, he was a fur trader on friendly terms with Native Americans.

In 1690, he returned with his family to New York, where he was listed as having the occupation of a "bolter". He was made a freeman on August 23, 1698. Politically active, he was a supporter of the party of Jacob Leisler, who had led an insurrection in 1689 in support of the succession of Dutch stadtholder William III of Orange-Nassau to the English thronein the Revolution of 1688. Nicholas Roosevelt was an alderman from 1698 to 1701 and again for the West Ward in 1715.

The Roosevelt family, including Nicholas, were slaveholders. One of Nicholas's slaves, Tom, was burned to death on suspicion of having participated in a failed slave rebellion in 1712.

== Personal life ==
He married Heyltje Jans Kunst (1664–1730) in the Reformed Dutch Church of New York on December 9, 1682. With his wife, he had ten children, the first four baptized at Esopus and the rest in New York:

- Jannetie Roosevelt (b. 1683)
- Margaretta Roosevelt (b. 1685)
- Nicholaes Roosevelt (b. 1687)
- Johannes Roosevelt (1689–1750), who married Heyltje Sjoerts (Shourd) (1688–1752) on September 25, 1708.
- Elsie Roosevelt (b. 1691)
- James Jacobus Roosevelt (1692–1776), who married Catharina Hardenbroek. They were the parents of Isaac Roosevelt.
- Rachel Roosevelt (b. 1693), who died young
- Sarah Roosevelt (b. 1696)
- Rachel Roosevelt (b. 1699)
- Isaac Roosevelt (b. 1701), who died young

He died in New York City on August 30, 1742.

=== Descendants ===
Nicholas and his wife were the last common ancestors of the Oyster Bay Roosevelts (including Theodore and Eleanor Roosevelt), founded by his son Johannes, and the Hyde Park Roosevelts (including Franklin Delano Roosevelt), founded by his son Jacobus. There are also descendants of his other children.

== See also ==
- Roosevelt family
