= Roosevelt & Son =

Defunct American investment banking firm

- Type: Partnership
- Industry: Investment banking
- Founded: 1797
- Founder: James Jacobus Roosevelt
- Defunct: 1934 (split into three firms)
- Successor: Roosevelt & Son; Roosevelt & Weigold; Dick & Merle Smith
- Headquarters: New York City, New York, United States
- Key people: Cornelius Roosevelt; James I. Roosevelt; Emlen Roosevelt; George Emlen Roosevelt

Roosevelt & Son was an American investment banking firm connected with the Roosevelt family for nearly two centuries. The firm was among the oldest banking houses on Wall Street. Many of the male members of the Roosevelt family worked for the firm in some capacity.

== History ==
Roosevelt & Son traces its history back to 1797, just seven years after Alexander Hamilton issued $80,000,000 of United States Government bonds, setting off the modern American banking system. The firm was founded as a hardware business by James Jacobus Roosevelt at 97 Maiden Lane in Manhattan. James' son Cornelius Roosevelt would join the business in 1818 as a partner and the firm would be renamed James I. Roosevelt & Son. Roosevelt & Son entered banking in the early decades of the 19th century by discounting the notes of various customers of the hardware business and later other merchants in New York City. In 1824, the Roosevelts were involved in the formation of the Chemical Bank. By 1850, Roosevelt had transitioned from the hardware trade to the importation of plate glass which was an important component of the construction boom going on at that time in New York.

In 1865, Cornelius Roosevelt retired from the company. By that time, in the mid-1860s, Roosevelt & Son had begun the transition toward becoming a fully-fledged banking house, primarily focused on private banking and investments. In 1876, the company sold its plate glass business to an English company and from that point forward was focused exclusively on financial services. The firm was known primarily for its "unbiased investment counsel" which the firm provided to a client base that included institutional investors, high-net-worth individuals and various trusts and estates.

In 1928, W. Emlen Roosevelt, first cousin of President Theodore Roosevelt, celebrated 50 years as a partner in the firm. In 1931, Van Santvoord Merle-Smith, Irving Brown, Charles B. Robinson and Charles E. Weigold were proposed as general partners in the firm. John K. Roosevelt was proposed as a special partner, as was the estate of Emlen Roosevelt, a former general partner of the firm who died in 1930.

=== Break-up of the firm ===
In 1934, in response to the passage of the Glass–Steagall Act Roosevelt & Son separated into three firms:

- Roosevelt & Son continued under its original name under the direction of George Emlen Roosevelt and his brother Philip James Roosevelt. Roosevelt & Son operated principally as an investment management firm. In early 1973, Clark, Dodge & Co. took over some personnel and the lease of the firm, and on August 22, 1973, Roosevelt & Son ceased to do business.
- Roosevelt & Weigold was headed by Archibald Roosevelt and Charles E. Weigold, and operated primarily as an underwriter of municipal bonds. The firm was suspended during World War II, when Roosevelt volunteered to serve in the U.S. Army. In 1946, Roosevelt founded Roosevelt & Cross with Edwin J. Cross. The firm continues to focus on municipal bond underwriting.
- Dick & Merle Smith was headed by Fairman R. Dick and Van S. Merle-Smith as well as Charles B. Robinson and John K. Roosevelt. Julian Roosevelt served as a vice-president of the firm in the 1970s.

== See also ==
- Roosevelt family
- List of investment banks
