= James A. Roosevelt =

American businessman and philanthropist (1825–1898)

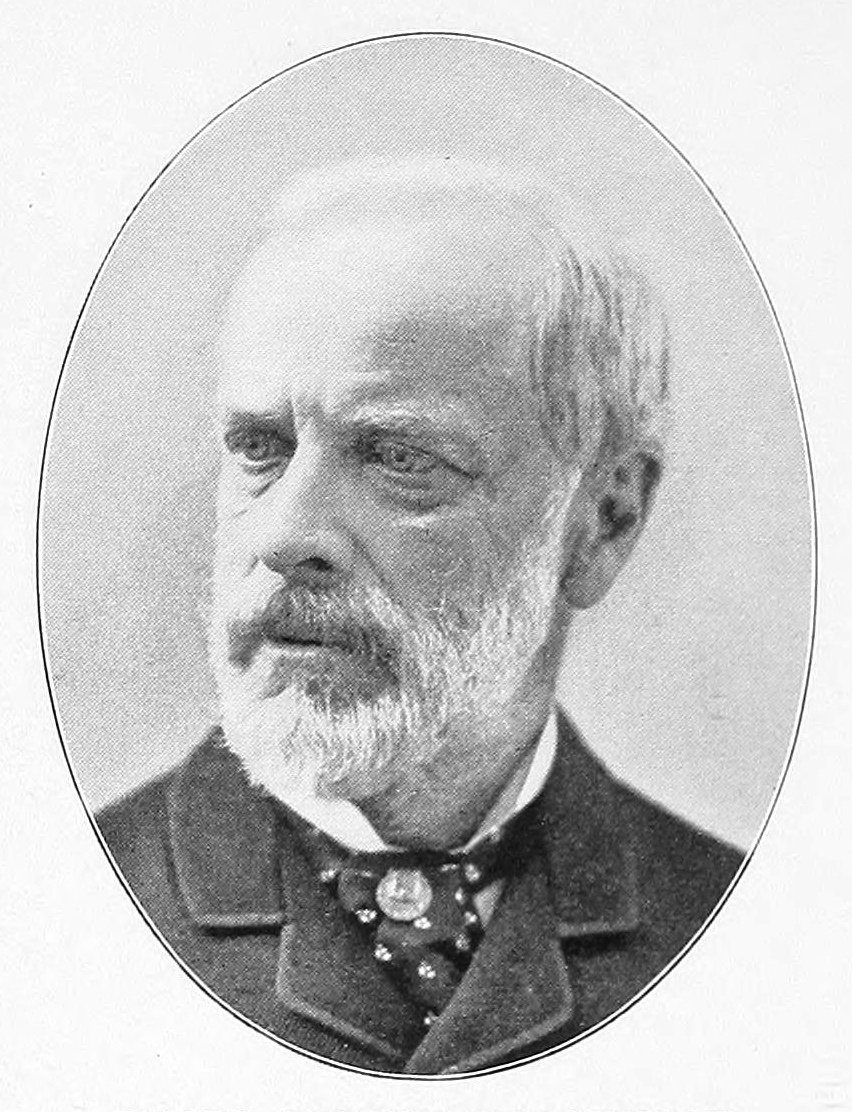
- Born: James Alfred Roosevelt; June 13, 1825; New York City, U.S.
- Died: July 15, 1898 (aged 73); New Hyde Park, New York, U.S.
- Resting place: Green-Wood Cemetery
- Occupations: Businessman; philanthropist
- Employer: Roosevelt & Son
- Spouse: Elizabeth Norris Emlen (m. 1847)
- Children: 4, including William
- Father: Cornelius Roosevelt
- Relatives: See Roosevelt family

James Alfred Roosevelt (June 13, 1825 – July 15, 1898) was an American businessman and philanthropist. A member of the Oyster Bay side of the Roosevelt family, he was an uncle of President Theodore Roosevelt.

== Early life ==
Roosevelt was born on June 13, 1825, to Cornelius Van Schaack Roosevelt (1794–1871) and Margaret Barnhill (1799–1861). His siblings were Silas Weir Roosevelt (1823–1870), Cornelius Van Schaack Roosevelt, Jr., Robert Barnhill Roosevelt (1829–1906), Theodore Roosevelt, Sr. (1831–1878), who was married to Martha "Mittie" Bulloch (1835–1884), and William Wallace Roosevelt (1834–1835).

== Career ==
Roosevelt became a member of his father's mercantile firm, Roosevelt & Son, at the age of 20, and eventually succeeded him as its head. He was connected with many other institutions, including vice president of the Chemical Bank of New York, president of the Broadway Improvement Company, vice president of the Bank of Savings, member of the board of managers of the Delaware and Hudson Canal Company, and director of the New York Life Insurance Trust.

He was a trustee to the Society for Prevention of Cruelty to Children and on the New York Board of Park Commissioners during the William Lafayette Strong Administration. He was the president of Roosevelt Hospital, which was founded by his distant cousin James H. Roosevelt.

== Personal life ==
On December 22, 1847, he married Elizabeth Norris Emlen (1825–1912), the daughter of William Fishbourne Emlen (1786–1866) and Mary Parker Norris (1791–1872). Together, they had four children, including:

- Mary Emlen Roosevelt (1848–1885)
- Leila Roosevelt (1850–1934), who married Edward Reeve Merritt (1850–1931).
- (James) Alfred Roosevelt (1856–1891), who married Katherine Lowell (1858–1925), a daughter of Augustus Lowell, in 1882.
- William Emlen Roosevelt (1857–1930), who married Christine Griffin Kean (1858–1936), a daughter of Col. John Kean, in 1883.

He died on July 15, 1898, near Mineola, New York, while riding a train on his way home to Oyster Bay, New York.

=== Descendants ===
Through his son, Alfred, he was the grandfather of Elfrida Roosevelt, who married Sir Orme Bigland Clarke, 4th Baronet, and was the mother of Sir Humphrey Clarke, 5th Baronet.

== Sources ==
- Cobb, William T. (1946). The Strenuous Life: The Oyster Bay Roosevelts in Business and Finance. William E. Rudge's Sons.
- Whittelsey, Charles B. (1902). The Roosevelt Genealogy, 1649–1902. Hartford, Conn., Press of J. B. Burr & co.
