= Cornelius Roosevelt =

American businessman

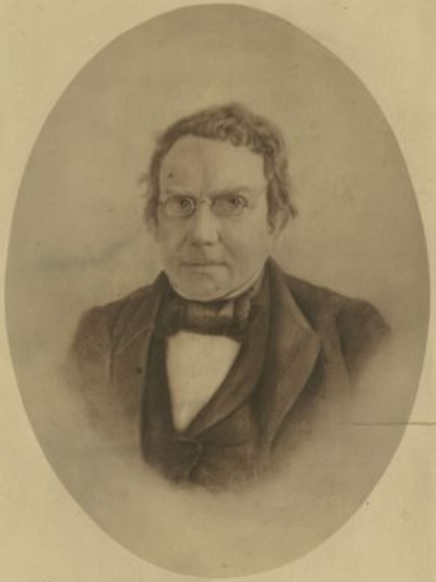
- Born: Cornelius Van Schaack Roosevelt; January 30, 1794; New York City, U.S.
- Died: July 17, 1871 (aged 77); Oyster Bay, New York, U.S.
- Other name: C.V.S. Roosevelt
- Education: Columbia College
- Occupation: Businessman
- Employer: Chemical Bank
- Spouse: Margaret Barnhill (m. 1821; died 1861)
- Children: 6, including James, Robert, and Theodore Sr.
- Father: James Jacobus Roosevelt
- Relatives: Roosevelt family

Cornelius Van Schaack "C.V.S." Roosevelt (January 30, 1794 – July 17, 1871) was an American businessman from New York City. He was a member of the prominent Roosevelt family and the paternal grandfather of U.S. President Theodore Roosevelt.

== Early life ==
Roosevelt was born on January 30, 1794, in New York City, to James Jacobus Roosevelt and Maria Helen Van Schaack. He was the last full-blooded Dutch Roosevelt of his line. His great-grandfather was Johannes Roosevelt, the founder of the Oyster Bay branch of the Roosevelt family. Through his grandfather Cornelius Van Schaack Jr., he was a grandnephew of Peter van Schaack and great-great-grandson of Maria Schuyler from the Schuyler family. Through Maria, he was a great-great-great-grandnephew of Dutch-American settler Philip Pieterse Schuyler and a great-great-great-grandson of David Pieterse Schuyler.

Cornelius's younger brother, James John Roosevelt, served as a United States Congressman from New York from 1841 until 1843. He attended Columbia College but academic life did not suit him, and he did not graduate.

== Career ==
In 1818, after leaving college, Roosevelt became his father's partner in importing hardware. "Economy is my doctrine at all times," he once said, "at all events till I become, if it is to be so, a man of fortune." At his insistence, the focus of the business changed from hardware to plate glass. After his father's death in 1840, he inherited a large fortune and was one of the five richest men in New York City. He continued to work in the business until his retirement in 1865.

In the Panic of 1837, he bought many lots in Manhattan for building.

In 1844, when New York Chemical Manufacturing Company's original charter expired, the chemical company was liquidated and was reincorporated as a bank only, becoming the Chemical Bank of New York in 1844. Roosevelt was among its first directors under its new charter, along with John D. Wolfe, Isaac Platt and Bradish Johnson, and the bank's president John Q. Jones. The company sold all remaining inventories from the chemical division as well as real estate holdings by 1851 and later became the present day Chase Bank.

== Personal life ==
On October 9, 1821, Roosevelt married Margaret Barnhill (1799–1861), a daughter of Robert Craig Barnhill and Elizabeth Potts. She was a descendant of English and Irish Quakers and of Thomas Pott of Wales. They had six sons:

- Silas Weir Roosevelt
- James Alfred Roosevelt,
- Cornelius Van Schaack Roosevelt Jr.
- Robert Barnhill Roosevelt
- Theodore "Thee" Roosevelt Sr.
- William Wallace Roosevelt.

When each of his sons married, he gifted them houses in New York.

On July 17, 1871, Roosevelt died at his home in Oyster Bay, New York. The New York Times memorialized him as a "merchant of the old school". His estate was valued at between $3 million and $7 million.

=== Descendants ===
Roosevelt's grandchildren include John Ellis Roosevelt (1853–1939), president of the Elkhorn Valley Coal Land Company, William Emlen Roosevelt (1857–1930), a banker and president of Roosevelt & Son, Theodore Roosevelt (1858–1919), the President of the United States from September 14, 1901, until March 4, 1909, and Granville Roland Fortescue (1875–1952), an author and soldier. One of Roosevelt's great-granddaughters was First Lady Eleanor Roosevelt. A great-great-grandson was Sir Humphrey Clarke, 5th Baronet (1906–1973).
