= Robert T. Gannett =

American politician and lawyer (1917–2012)

- Born: Robert Tileston Gannett; September 26, 1917; Boston, Massachusetts, U.S.
- Died: August 26, 2012 (aged 94); Brattleboro, Vermont, U.S.
- Education: Harvard University (AB, LLB)
- Occupations: Politician; lawyer
- Spouse: Sarah Alden Derby (m. 1941; died 1999)
- Children: 3

Robert Tileston Gannett (September 26, 1917 – August 26, 2012) was an American politician and lawyer.

Born in Boston, Massachusetts, Gannett graduated from Milton Academy in 1935. He then graduated from Harvard University in 1939 and received his law degree from Harvard Law School in 1942. He enlisted in the United States Army during World War II. He served in the field artillery from 1942 to 1946, including combat service in Europe in 1944 and 1945, and attained the rank of major. After the war, he practiced law in Brattleboro, Vermont. Gannett served as a Republican in the Vermont House of Representatives from 1953 to 1961 and served in the Vermont State Senate from 1972 to 1993.

Gannett was married to Sarah Alden "Aldie" Derby (December 11, 1920 – May 17, 1999), a granddaughter of President Theodore Roosevelt. The couple had three children. In 1986, the Vermont Chamber of Commerce selected him as its Man of the Year. Both Gannett and his wife, Aldie, received honorary degrees from the University of Vermont. He was affiliated with Brattleboro Memorial Hospital, the Prouty Center, the Southern Vermont Arts Council, the Vermont Community Foundation, Youth Services, the Green Mountain Club, the Brattleboro Retreat, the Snelling Center, Harris Hill and the Brattleboro Rotary Club (of which he was a founding member).

Gannett died in Brattleboro, Vermont, aged 94.
