= John Roosevelt (politician) =

American businessman and alderman (1689–1750)

Johannes Roosevelt

Alderman of New York City
- In office 1730–1733

Personal details
- Born: Esopus, Ulster County, Province of New York
- Died: April 4, 1750 (aged 61) New York City, British North America
- Spouse: Heyltje Sjoerts (m. 1708)
- Relations: Roosevelt family
- Children: 11
- Parent: Nicholas Roosevelt (father)
- Occupation: Businessman; politician
- Nickname: John Roosevelt

Johannes Roosevelt (bap. February 27, 1689 – April 4, 1750), known as John Roosevelt, was a New York City businessman and politician and the progenitor of the Oyster Bay Roosevelts, including Theodore and Eleanor Roosevelt.

== Early life ==
Johannes Roosevelt was baptized on February 27, 1689, in Esopus, Province of New York (near Kingston) while his father, Nicholas Roosevelt (1658–1742), and mother, Heyltje Jans Kunst (1664–1730), were living there. Nicholas, born in New Amsterdam, was the son of the Roosevelt immigrant ancestor, Claes Maartenszen van Rosenvelt (c. 1626–1659). By 1690, he had moved his family back to New York City.

In 1730, Johannes became a freeman. He was assistant alderman from 1717 to 1727 and alderman from 1730 to 1733.

According to one history, "he was successful in farming and business ventures, and took what seemed to his friends a strange and extravagant delight in works of art. He is said to have been one of the first to import paintings, fine furniture, and artistic metal ware from the Netherlands. He did it on so generous a scale that his home was viewed as a wonderland by his less enterprising fellow-citizens."

=== Slavery ===
Johannes Roosevelt's slave, Quack, was one of the accused conspirators in the alleged slave rebellion that terrified New York City in 1741. He was convicted of setting fire to Fort George and executed by being burned at the stake.

== Personal life ==
Johannes married Heyltje Sjoerts (Shourd) (1688–1752) on September 25, 1708, at the Reformed Dutch Church of New York. She was the daughter of Olvert Sjoerts (1661–1710), who was born in the Netherlands and emigrated to New Netherland. Johannes and Heyltje had eleven children:

- Margreta Roosevelt (1709–1776), who married William De Peyster (1701–1751) on May 5, 1730, son of Johannes de Peyster.
- Nicholas Roosevelt (bap. 1710, died in the West Indies)
- Johannes Roosevelt (bap. 1712)
- Heyltje Roosevelt (bap. 1714)
- Olphert Oliver Roosevelt (1716–1785), who married Elizabeth Lounsbury in 1740.
- Jacobus Roosevelt (bap. 1718, died in infancy)
- Maria Roosevelt (1720–1755), who married Abraham Duryea (b. 1720) on February 11, 1743
- Jannetje Roosevelt (bap. 1723, died 1724)
- Jacobus James Roosevelt (bap. 1724), who first married Annetje Bogart (b. 1728) on December 2, 1746; they were the parents of James Jacobus Roosevelt. On July 14, 1774, he married Helena Gibson, widow of Mr. Thompson.
- Aeltje Roosevelt (bap. 1726, died 1727)
- Cornelius Roosevelt (bap. 1731), he married Margaret Haering (1733–1821) on December 9, 1751.

=== Descendants ===
Johannes was an ancestor of the Oyster Bay branch of the Roosevelt family. He was, via his son Jacobus James, the grandfather of James Jacobus Roosevelt (1759–1840), the great-grandfather of Cornelius Van Schaack Roosevelt (1794–1871), the 3x great-grandfather of Theodore Roosevelt, and the 4x great-grandfather of Eleanor Roosevelt.

== See also ==
- Roosevelt family
