= John Ellis Roosevelt =

American lawyer (1853–1939)

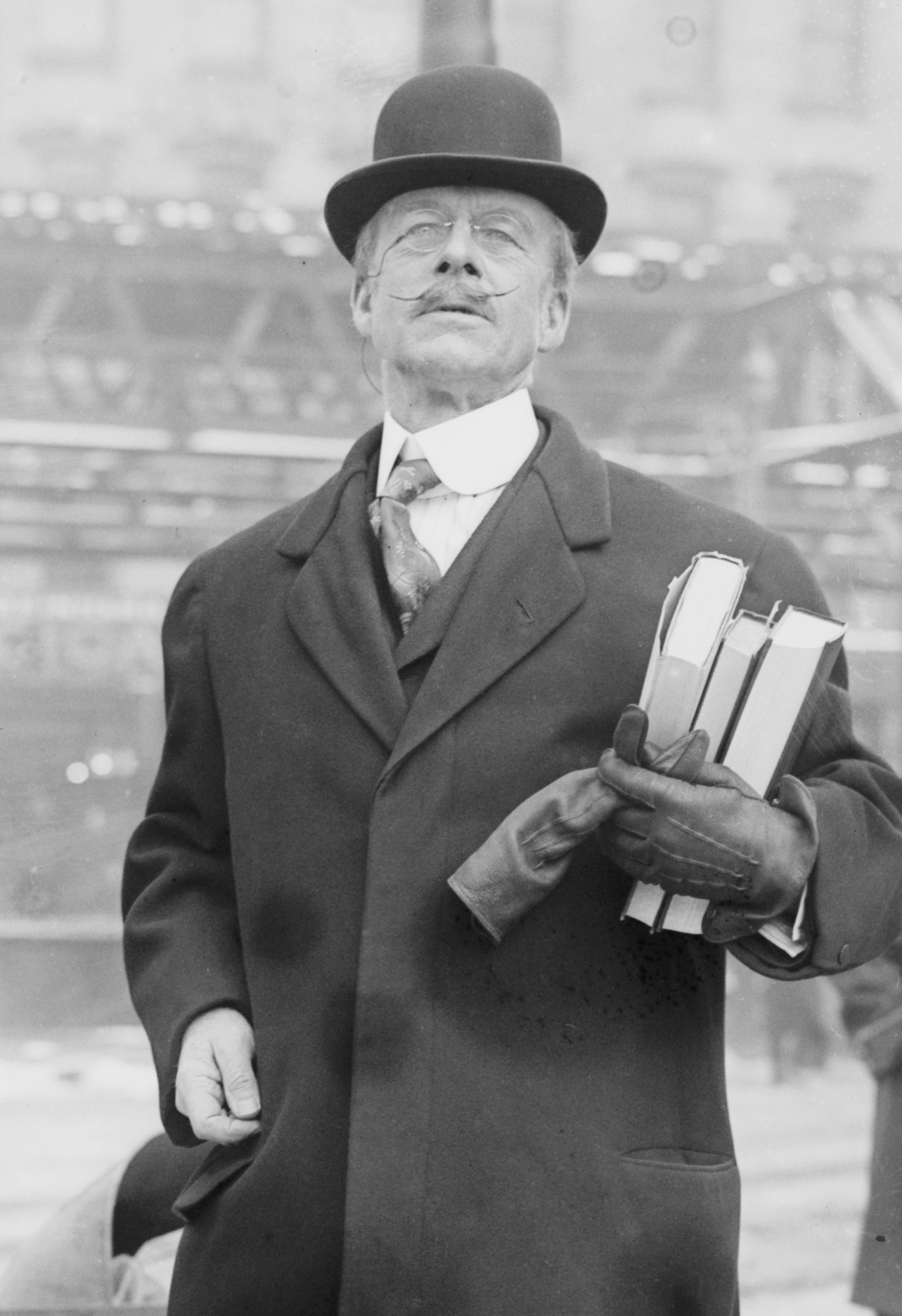
- Roosevelt, ca. 1915-1916
- Born: February 25, 1853; New York City
- Died: April 9, 1939 (aged 86); Delray Beach, Florida
- Occupation: Lawyer
- Spouses: Nannie Mitchell Vance (m. 1879; death 1912) Edith Hammersley Biscoe (m. 1914; div. 1916)
- Children: 3
- Parent(s): Robert Barnhill Roosevelt; Elizabeth Ellis
- Relatives: See Roosevelt family

John Ellis Roosevelt (February 25, 1853 – March 9, 1939) was a lawyer with the Wall Street firm of Roosevelt & Kobbe, the president of the Elkhorn Valley Coal Land Company and secretary of the Broadway Improvement Company. He owned the John Ellis Roosevelt Estate.

== Early life ==
John Ellis Roosevelt was born on February 25, 1853, in New York City. He was the second child of Robert Barnhill Roosevelt (who was also known as Robert Barnwell Roosevelt) and Elizabeth Ellis. Roosevelt had an older sister, Margaret Barnhill Roosevelt, and a younger brother, Robert Barnhill Roosevelt Jr. They were the first cousins of President Theodore Roosevelt through their shared paternal grandfather, Cornelius Van Schaack Roosevelt.

He also had three half-siblings; Kenyon Fortescue, Granville Roland Fortescue, and Maude Fortescue. They were the children of Robert Barnhill Roosevelt and his second wife, Marion (Minnie) Fortescue, also known as Marion O'Shea Roosevelt.

== Career ==
=== Law practice ===
During his career as an attorney, John Ellis Roosevelt was a partner in the Wall Street law firm of Roosevelt & Kobbe, along with George C. Kobbé, at 44 Wall Street. His half brother, Kenyon Fortescue was also a lawyer at the same firm.

The firm represented John Ellis Roosevelt's father, Robert Barnwell Roosevelt, in the lawsuit Robert B. Roosevelt v. Elbert A. Brinckerhoff, 143 F. 478 (2nd Cir. 1906). Brinckerhoff alleged that Robert Barnwell Roosevelt had committed malpractice by permitting a mortgage on a valuable piece of Manhattan real estate at 33 Nassau Street to be cancelled. Damages were assessed against Robert Barnwell Roosevelt in excess of $100,000. Robert Barnwell Roosevelt died four months after the decision was entered.

=== Other business ventures ===
In addition to practicing law, Roosevelt was the president of the Elkhorn Valley Coal Land Company and secretary of the Broadway Improvement Company.

== Personal life ==
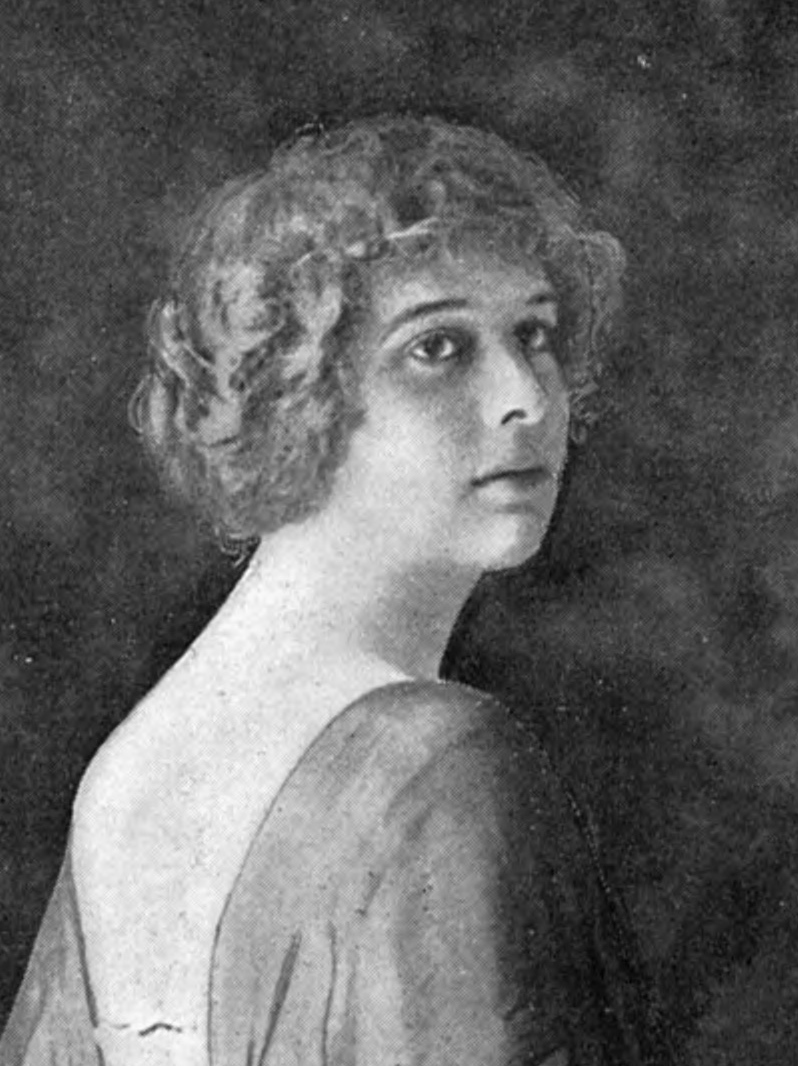
Miss Gladys Roosevelt, c. 1913, from Harper's Bazaar

On February 19, 1879, he married Nannie Mitchell Vance (1860–1912), the daughter of Samuel B. H. Vance (1814–1890), at the recently built St. Nicholas Collegiate Reformed Protestant Dutch Church, Fifth Avenue and 48th Street, in New York City in Manhattan. Before her death of typhoid in 1912, they had three daughters:

- Anita Blanche "Pansy" Roosevelt (1882–1929), who was "ill from nervous prostration in a sanitarium in New York" in 1903.
- Gladys Roosevelt (1889–1926), who married Fairman Rogers Dick (1885–1976), son of Evans R. Dick, in 1913. Fairman's sister, Isabelle Mildred Dick (1884–1972) was married to Stuyvesant Fish, Jr. (1883–1952), and stood up in their wedding. Gladys was killed in a horse riding accident at the Meadow Brook Hunt Club in 1926.
- Jean Schermerhorn Roosevelt (1891–1984), who married Philip James Roosevelt (1892–1941), a cousin and the son of Emlen Roosevelt, in 1925.

His wife died on September 26, 1912, of typhoid.

On January 6, 1914, he married Edith (née Hammersley) Biscoe (1884-1943), the former wife of Lt. H. E. Biscoe. Edith's sister, Lillie O. Hammersley was married to John's brother, Robert. In 1915, Roosevelt tried to have the marriage annulled, claiming he was the victim of misrepresentation. The case was heavily reported in the News at the time. Edith won the case in 1916 and Roosevelt was ordered to pay her $400 a month in alimony.

John E. Roosevelt was a founder of The Sayville Yacht Club and served as its inaugural Commodore from 1901 to 1907.

His former summer estate, Meadow Croft is now a county park in Suffolk County.

Roosevelt died on March 9, 1939, in Delray Beach, Florida.
