= John Kean (colonel) =

American businessman and public official

Colonel John Kean (March 27, 1814 – January 17, 1895) was an American businessman and public official.

== Early life ==
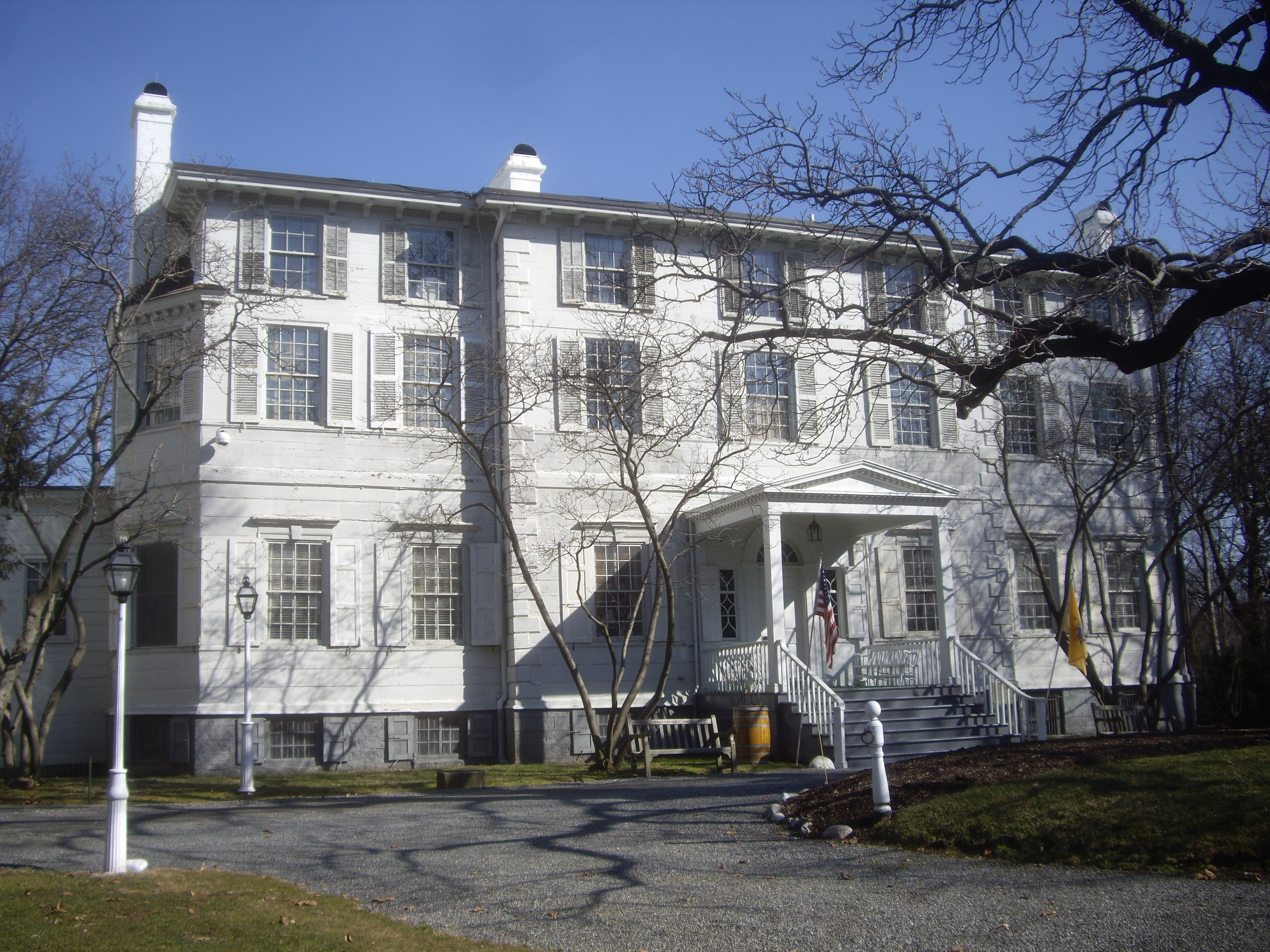
Liberty Hall, the Kean family mansion purchased by his father in 1811 for his grandmother, built by his father's great-uncle William Livingston in 1772.

Kean was born on March 27, 1814. He was the eldest son of Peter Philip James Kean and Sarah Sabina (née Morris) Kean (1788–1878). His sister, Julia Ursin Niemcewiez Kean, married Governor of New York, U.S. Senator, and U.S. Secretary of State Hamilton Fish (a descendant of Peter Stuyvesant).

His father was the only child of Continental Congressmen John Kean, who also served as cashier of the Bank of the United States, and Susan (née Livingston) Kean. After his grandfather's early death in 1795, his grandmother married Count Julian Niemcewicz in 1800. His maternal grandparents were General Jacob Morris (Lewis Morris, a signor of the Declaration of Independence) and Mary (née Cox) Morris.

Kean graduated from Princeton University in 1834.

== Career ==
Following his father's death in 1828, Kean inherited Liberty Hall, the family mansion in Union Township, Union County, New Jersey, that his father had purchased in 1811 for his grandmother. The home had been built by his father's great-uncle William Livingston in 1772. Kean owned the estate for over sixty-five years, transforming the house from a 14-room country house into the 50-room mansion that remains.

Kean invested in banks, railroads, and public utilities including the Elizabethtown Gas Light Company (which he founded), and the Elizabethtown Water Company (controlled by his son, John, and today a part of American Water). He helped to found the Central Railroad of New Jersey and served as its first president. While on the staff of Governor William Pennington (under whom he studied law), Kean acquired the rank of Colonel, a title he used the rest of his life.

== Personal life ==
Kean was married to Lucinetta "Lucy" Halsted (1825–1912), a daughter of Caroline Louisa (née Pitney) Halsted (1796–1879) and merchant Caleb O. Halsted, who served as president of the Bank of the Manhattan Company. Through her father, she was a descendant of colonist John Ogden, an original patentee of the Elizabethtown Purchase, "the first English settlement in the Colony of New Jersey." Together, they were the parents of eleven children, nine of whom survived to adulthood, including:

- Caroline Morris Kean (1849–1887), who married George Lockhart Rives, a descendant of the Schuyler, the Van Cortlandt and the Delancey families, in 1873.
- John Kean (1852–1914), who never married and who served as a U.S. Senator from 1899 to 1911 and U.S. Representative from 1883 to 1885 and from 1887 to 1889.
- Susan Livingston Kean (1852–1925), who never married and lived at 844 Fifth Avenue.
- Julian Halsted Kean (1854–1932), who never married and who served as president of the National State Bank of Elizabeth.
- Christine Griffin Kean (1858–1936), who married banker Emlen Roosevelt, a son of James A. Roosevelt and cousin to President Theodore Roosevelt, in 1883.
- Lucy Halsted Kean (1859–1929), who never married and lived at 844 Fifth Avenue.
- Hamilton Fish Kean (1862–1941), who served as a U.S. Senator from 1929 to 1935 and who married Katharine Taylor Winthrop, a daughter of banker Robert Winthrop and Katherine (née Taylor) Winthrop, in 1888.
- Elizabeth d'Hauteville Kean (1864–1922), who never married and lived at 844 Fifth Avenue.
- Alexander Livingston Kean (1866–1922), who never married and worked in the Intelligence Department.

Kean died on January 17, 1895, at the family homestead at Ursino. After his death, the Kean mansion passed to his eldest son, Senator John Kean. As he never married, the house passed to Hamilton's son, Capt. John Kean upon his death.

=== Descendants ===
Through his son Hamilton, he was a grandfather of banker John Kean (1888–1949) and U.S. Representative Robert Winthrop Kean (1893–1980).
