= James H. Roosevelt =

American philanthropist

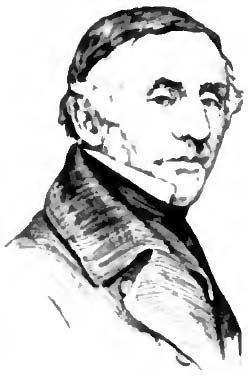
- Born: James Henry Roosevelt; November 10, 1800; New York City, New York, U.S.
- Died: November 30, 1863 (aged 63); New York City, New York, U.S.
- Resting place: New York City Marble Cemetery
- Education: Columbia College; Harvard Law School
- Known for: Founder of Roosevelt Hospital
- Parent(s): Catherine Byvanck; James Christopher Roosevelt
- Relatives: See Roosevelt family

James Henry Roosevelt (November 10, 1800 – November 30, 1863) was an American philanthropist who, by bequest, founded Roosevelt Hospital in New York City.

== Early life ==
Roosevelt was born on November 10, 1800, in New York City on Warren Street near Broadway. He was the son of Catherine (née Byvanck) (d. 1854) and James Christopher Roosevelt (1770–1840).

A member of the Roosevelt family, his paternal grandfather was Christopher Roosevelt (b. 1739), the brother of Isaac Roosevelt, 2nd President of the Bank of New York. He was a third cousin of President Theodore Roosevelt's grandfather and second cousin of President Franklin Delano Roosevelt's grandfather.

== Education and life ==
Roosevelt graduated from Columbia College in 1819 and studied law at Harvard University, but was unable to practice due to delicate health, possibly resulting from polio. Confined largely to his home he was forced to abandon law and break off his engagement to Miss Julia Boardman, who was also from a good New York family. He lived off of a modest inheritance and expanded it through prudent investments and simple living.

Roosevelt died on November 30, 1863, in New York City. He was first buried at the New York City Marble Cemetery, and later, his remains were moved to the Roosevelt Hospital grounds in 1876. His body was again moved in 1994 and re-interred at the Marble Cemetery.

=== Legacy ===
His will left most of his estate, including property worth nearly $1 million, to found Roosevelt Hospital, which was opened on November 2, 1871. Under the terms of his will, the hospital was to be a voluntary hospital that cared for individuals regardless of their ability to pay. On the tablet that is placed to his memory in Roosevelt Hospital is inscribed: "To the memory of James Henry Roosevelt, a true son of New York, the generous founder of this hospital, a man upright in his aims, simple in his life, and sublime in his benefaction."
