= James Thayer Addison =

American Episcopalian

The Reverend James Thayer Addison Doctor of Divinity
- Born: James Thayer Addison; March 21, 1887; Fitchburg, Massachusetts, U.S.
- Died: February 13, 1953 (aged 65); Boston, Massachusetts, U.S.
- Education: Groton School (1905), Harvard University (1909), Episcopal Theological School (1913)
- Occupations: 1. Taught at St. John's University, Shanghai (1909-1910), 2. Taught at Episcopal Theological School (1915-1940), 3. Chaplain of the First Gas Regiment, A.E.F. in World War I (1918-1919), 4. Vice president of the National Council of the Episcopal Church (1940-1947)
- Notable work: The Medieval Missionary; A Study of the Conversion of Northern Europe, A.D. 500-1300 (1936); War, Peace, and the Christian Mind: A Review of Recent Thought (1953).
- Spouse: Margaret Beecher Crocker (1896-1978)
- Children: Two daughters: Helen Crocker and Martha Lothrop
- Theological work
- Main interests: Christian foreign missionary work
- Notable ideas: Every Christian should be a missionary.

James Thayer Addison (March 21, 1887 – February 13, 1953) was a priest in the Episcopal Church. His career included serving as an Episcopal Church missionary, as a professor in the Episcopal Theological School, as a military chaplain during World War I, and as a prolific writer.

== Early life and education ==
Addison was born on March 21, 1887, in Fitchburg, Massachusetts.

Addison’s father was The Rev. Charles Morris Addison (1856-1947) who was an Episcopal parish priest and author. His mother was Ada Thayer Addison (1856-1934). He is the great grandson of Charles Morris who served on the USS Constitution.

From 1900 to 1905, Addison attended and graduated from the Groton School. He graduated from Harvard University with a Bachelor of Arts degree in 1909. Immediately after graduating from Harvard, Addison went to China where he taught for a year in St. John's University, Shanghai.

After his year in Shanghai, Addison returned to the United States and entered the Episcopal Theological School. He graduated with a Bachelor of Divinity degree 1913. Right after graduating, Addison was ordained a deacon in the Episcopal Church on June 7, 1913. As soon as he was ordained deacon, he went as a missionary to Oklahoma where he was ordained a priest on December 13, 1913.

During his time in Oklahoma, 1913-1915, Addison was minister in charge of St. Mark’s Church, Nowata, Oklahoma, and St. Paul’s Church in Claremore, Oklahoma. Both of these churches were in Indian Territory. Addison’s bishop, Theodore Payne Thurston, said that the two stations under Addison’s charge “are not only continuing their good record, but are improving upon it.”

== Career as professor ==
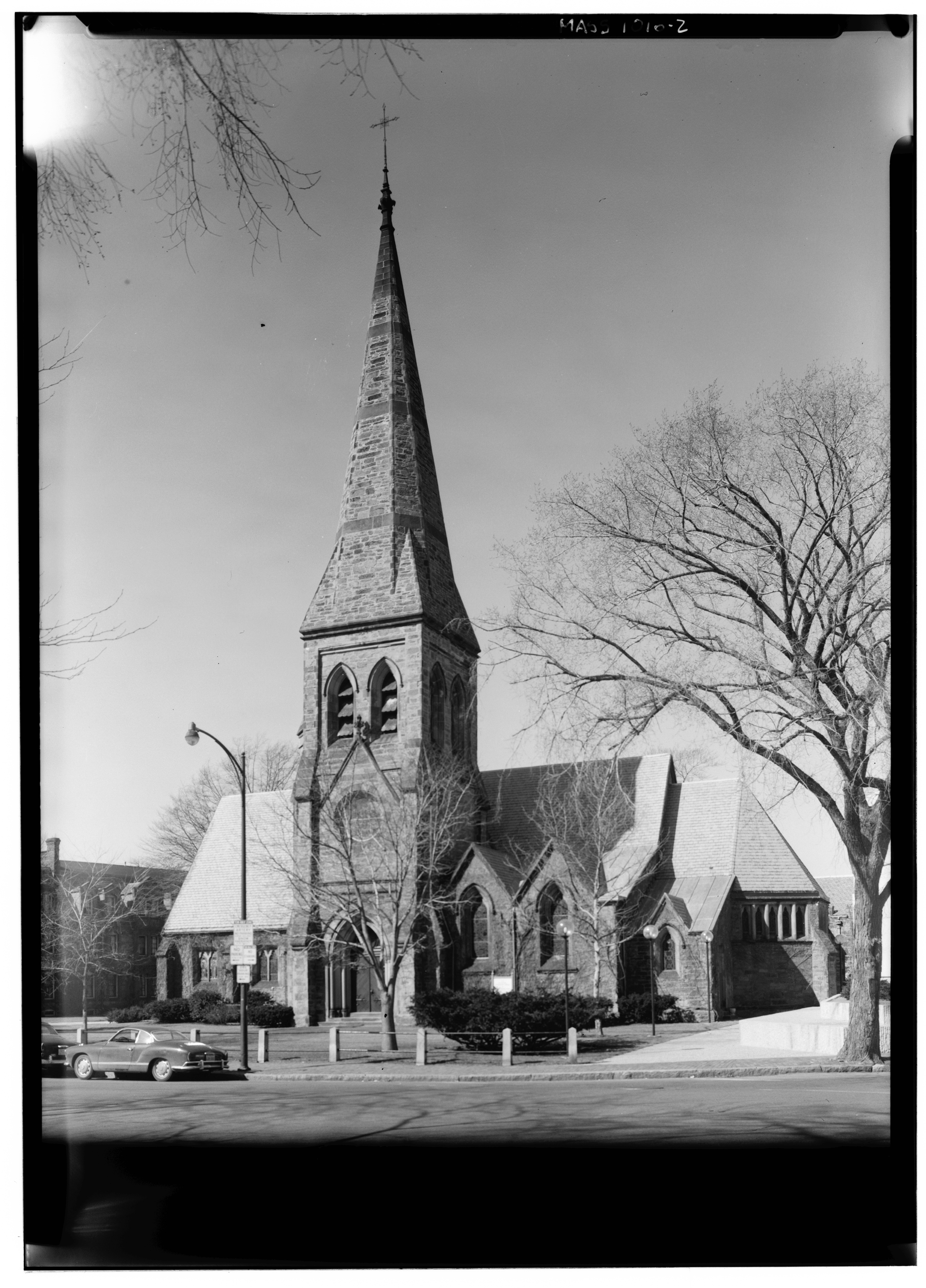
Episcopal Theological School Chapel

After his service in Oklahoma, Addison joined the faculty of the Episcopal Theological School as a lecturer in the History of Religion and Missions, 1915-1918. As such, “he held the only professorship of missions in any Episcopal Church seminary.”

On December 18, 1917, Addison married Margaret Beecher Crocker (1896-1978). They had two daughters: Helen Crocker and Martha Lothrop.

In 1918, Addison temporarily left the Episcopal Theological School to serve as chaplain of the First Gas Regiment, A.E.F. in World War I. At the end of the War in 1919, he returned to his teaching position. He remained in his teaching position until 1940.

After returning from his service as military chaplain, Addison was promoted from lecturer to assistant professor of the History of Religion and Missions.

In 1922, the Episcopal Theological School began a plan of its professor of History of Religion and Missions to a place in the mission field six months every three years. Under this plan, Addison went to China in 1922. He spent the months of March, April and May 1922 teaching at Boone University, Wuchang. Addison resumed teaching his regular courses in the fall of 1922.

In 1926, Addison was promoted to full professor in 1926. He held this position until 1940 when he resigned.

During the academic year of 1932-33, Addison served “as acting Master of Kirkland House” at Harvard University.

In 1940, Addison resigned his position as professor in the Episcopal Theological School in 1940 to take a position with the National Council of the Episcopal Church. During his twenty-five years teaching, Addison had “studied and taught at different times in Japan, China, Egypt, and Lebanon.”

== Career as Episcopal Church executive ==
In 1940, Addison became vice president of the National Council, and director of the Church's Overseas Department. As such, he supervised the Episcopal Church's missionary work in China, Japan, the Philippines, Brazil, Puerto Rico, and other overseas fields.

A 1941 newspaper article called Addison “one of the outstanding present-day authorities on Christian missions in the Episcopal church.” He was also “a leading American authority on Islamic problems.”

In February 1944, at the Annual Meeting of the National Council of the Episcopal Church, the question arose whether to use legacies received by the church to pay off debts or for current missionary work. Bishop Peabody of New York moved that the legacies be used to pay off debts. Addison spoke against the motion saying that “it is sounder to use these legacies actually in the mission field.”

On April 7, 1944, the Archbishop of York (Cyril Garbett) arrived in New York City. As representing the Episcopal Church, Addison met him.

On April 25–27, 1944, the National Council of the Episcopal Church, Addison (vice-president of the Council and head of the Overseas Department) read several “cable and radio-grams” from the Chinese Church. They proposed opening a second St. John’s University in Free China to enable students living in Free China to attend St. John’s without having to go to the St. John’s University located in a Japanese controlled area. While in favor of the proposal, Addison’s motion was that it be endorsed but not founded by the National Council. The National Council endorsed the idea with a token gift of $2,000.

In 1947, poor health compelled Addison to resign his position as vice president of the National Council and executive of the Overseas Department. The Episcopal Church magazine The Living Church, in is report of Addison’s retiring wrote that his travel and study “bore full fruition in planning” the missionary program of the Episcopal Church.

In retirement, Addison continued writing. When he died, he had just completed writing his final book, War, Peace, and the Christian Mind. It was published posthumously.

== Honors, positions and tributes ==
Addison was a member of the Phi Beta Kappa honor society.

In Addison’s honor, the James Thayer Addison Fellowship Fund was established. Its income is “to be used for the training of young men and women, members of the Anglican Communion, natives of areas formerly or now a part of the overseas work of the Protestant Episcopal Church, who desire to serve the Church as Church workers, clerical or lay, among their own people.”

Addison was awarded a Doctor of Divinity honorary degree by the Virginia Theological Seminary in 1931.

For many years, he served as a trustee of the American University in Cairo, Egypt.

== Illness and death ==
On February 8, 1942, while Addison was serving as vice-president of the National Council of the Episcopal Church in charge of Missions, “he suffered a severe heart attack.” The prognosis was “favorable.”

Addison died of a heart attack on February 13, 1953, at his home in Boston, Massachusetts at the age of sixty-five.

His body was cremated with the cremains being placed in the columbarium of Mount Auburn Cemetery, Cambridge, Massachusetts, US.

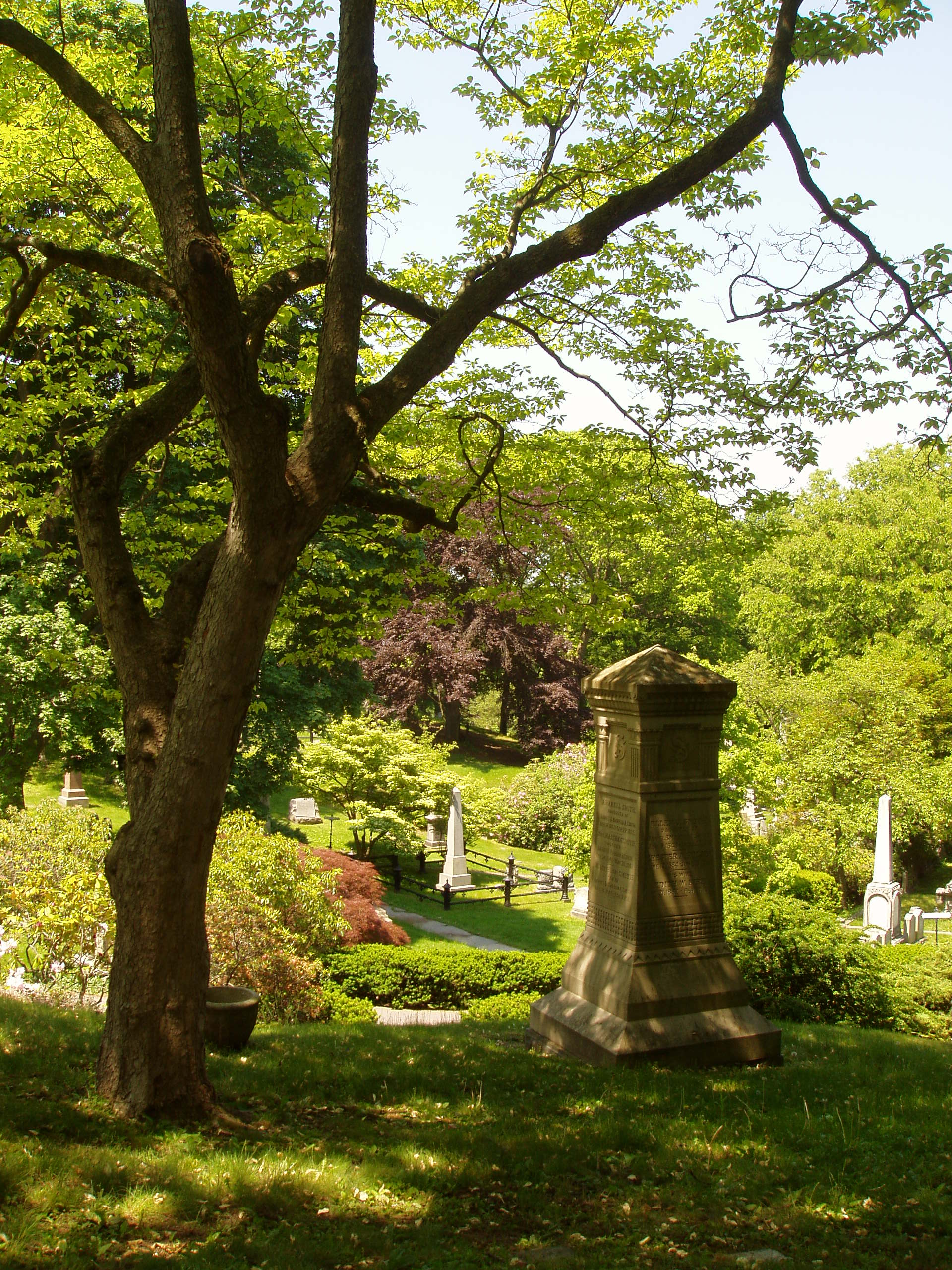
Mount Auburn Cemetery

Addison was survived by his wife Margaret, their two daughters, Mrs. Robert M. Hatch, wife of the suffragan bishop of the Diocese of Connecticut, Mrs. Samuel N. McCain Jr., wife of an Episcopal Church missionary in Hawaii, and five grandchildren.

== Eulogy ==
The Presiding Bishop of the Episcopal Church, Henry Knox Sherrill, wrote, “Dr. Addison had many talents. He was a scholar with unusual insight and precision. He wrote clearly and persuasively But most of all he was a consecrated disciple of the Lord Jesus Christ. In all that he did so effectively, there was the warmth of deep and single-hearted conviction.”

The Episcopal Church magazine The Living Church, in its report of Addison’s death, wrote the following:

Dr. Addison's missionary convictions were summed up in his classic work, Our Expanding Church. In it he said, “From our point of view, then, as members of a Christian Church in a Christian land, missions mean pioneering. They are the Church in action on the frontiers of religion. Like all pioneering movements missions are a sign of the Church's vitality. The Church is . . . first and foremost an expeditionary force, an organized body charged with a stirring and difficult campaign. It is a Church militant represented on every front and on every frontier. And among all who are commissioned in that Church by baptism there should prevail the sense of urgent mission, the spirit of unresting advance.”

== Works ==
- The Story of the First Gas Regiment (Houghton Mifflin, 1919).
- Chinese Ancestor Worship: A Study of Its Meaning and Its Relations with Christianity (Church Literature Committee of the Chung Hua Sheng Kung Hui by the help of the Society for Promoting Christian Knowledge, 1925).
- Religious life in Japan (Harvard Divinity School, 1925).
- Our Father's Business: a Book for Lent (George H. Doran, 1927).
- Francis Xavier (Church Missions Pub. Co, 1929).
- François Coillard (Church Missions Pub. Co.,1929).
- Religion in India (Church Missions Pub. Co, 1931).
- The Reasons for Missions (Pilgrim Press, 1932).
- Life Beyond Death in the Beliefs of Mankind (Houghton Mifflin Co, 1932). Translated into French by Robert Godet as La vie après la mort dans les croyances de l'humanité (Paris: Payot, 1936). Translated into Hungarian by Havas József Fordítása as Élet a Halál Után (Budapest, Dante ko Nyvkiado, 1937).
- With Mildred Hewitt. The Way of Christ: A Book for Young Readers (London: George G. Harrap & Co, 1935).
- The Medieval Missionary; A Study of the Conversion of Northern Europe, A.D. 500-1300 (International Missionary Council, 1936). This book placed Addison “in the forefront of American missionary historians.”
- The Lord's Prayer; a Book for Lent (Morehouse, 1937).
- The World of Islam (The National council of the Protestant Episcopal Church, 1937).
- Variety in the Devotional Life: a Paper Delivered at the Clergy Conference of the Diocese of New York at Bear Mountain, October 4, 1939 (New York: publisher not identified, 1939) .
- Parables of Our Lord Meditations for Lent (Morehouse-Gorham, 1940).
- Why Missions? (Protestant Episcopal Church. General Convention on Strategy and Policy, 1940).
- The Christian Approach to the Moslem: A Historical Study (Columbia University Press, 1942). A review of the book found its primary importance in its explanation of “the half-heartedness and ineffectiveness missions to Moslems.”
- Outline of Topics for a Course on Overseas Missions (publisher not identified, 1945).
- The Completeness of Christ (Morehouse-Gorham, 1947).
- Our Expanding Church (New York, The National Council of the Protestant Episcopal Church, 1944).
- The Way of Christ (Forward Movement Publications, 1949). Translated into Chinese by Qun Ye as Yesu zhi lu (Shanghai: Guang xue hui, Minguo 29, 1940).
- The Episcopal Church in the United States, 1789-1931 (Scribner, 1951). In this book Addison says that an institutional church is “a city church organized to provide not only worship and instruction but an expanding array of social services.”
- Early Anglican Thought, 1559-1667 (New Brunswick, N.J., 1953).
- War, Peace, and the Christian Mind: A Review of Recent Thought (Seabury Press, 1953).

Articles

- “Ancestor Worship in Africa,” Harvard Theological Review, 1924. OCLC 26140234
- “The Ahmadiyya Movement and its Western Propaganda,” Harvard Theological Review, vol. 22, (1929)
- “Thomas Fuller, Historian and Humorist,” Historical Magazine of the Protestant Episcopal Church, Vol. 21, No. 1, "The Caroline Divines Number" (March, 1952)
- “Jeremy Taylor, Preacher and Pastor,” Historical Magazine of the Protestant Episcopal Church, Vol. 21, No. 1, "The Caroline Divines Number" (March, 1952)
