= List of children of presidents of the United States =

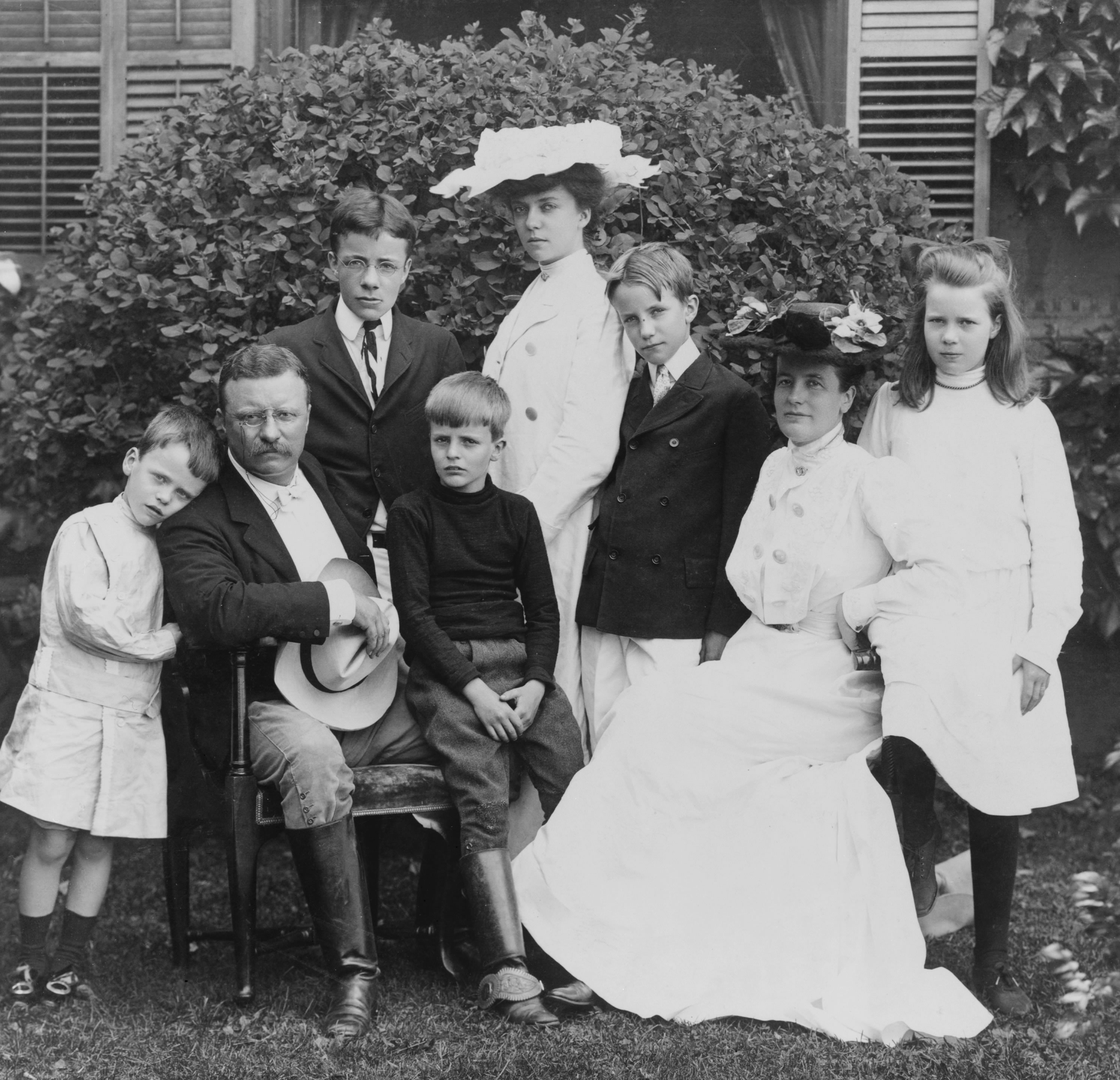
Theodore Roosevelt and Edith Carow Roosevelt with their children. Children from left to right: Quentin Roosevelt, Theodore Roosevelt Jr., Archibald Roosevelt, Alice Longworth, Kermit Roosevelt, and Ethel Roosevelt Derby

The following people are children of U.S. presidents, including biological children, confirmed and alleged extramarital children, adopted or abducted children, stepchildren, and legal wards. Status of paternity investigation/confirmation is included with entries for alleged extramarital children. All full names (including full married names) are given. Currently there are 32 confirmed, known living presidential children, of whom the oldest is Lynda Bird Johnson Robb and the youngest is Barron Trump. Two presidential children, John Quincy Adams and George W. Bush, have become president in their own right. John Scott Harrison is the only person to be both a child of a U.S. president and a parent of another U.S. president, being a son of William Henry Harrison and the father of Benjamin Harrison. Five presidents fathered no (known, biological) children: George Washington, James Madison, Andrew Jackson, James K. Polk, and James Buchanan. Wives of two of these presidents, Martha Washington and Dolley Madison, had children from previous marriages; Rachel Jackson had no biological children from either of her marriages. At least six presidents have had alleged or confirmed extramarital children. Several presidents, including Thomas Jefferson, John Tyler, William Henry Harrison, and Andrew Johnson, have alleged or confirmed extramarital children with enslaved women or girls who could not legally consent to or reject sexual intercourse with their enslavers because they had no legal personhood and no recourse of any kind. During the Creek War, Andrew Jackson sent three Indigenous or mixed-race babies to the Hermitage. These children have been variously described as adopted or as spoils of war.

Presidential children have been studied individually and as a class. As individuals they are more often notable in their own right than most individuals: They disproportionately circulate among political and social leaders and the wealthier classes, and they are more likely to be scrutinized as part of celebrity culture. Additionally, as individuals they frequently have significant influence on other family members. For instance, a child may have had a significant influence on the child's parent: acting as a sounding board, or having behavioral issues that affected the parent's beliefs or performance. A number of presidential sons and wards have served their fathers as Secretary to the President of the United States. Due to a combination of nepotism, generational wealth, and the spoils system, children of presidents have often received benefit from being born into an American political family, either by dint of government appointments or other advantage in running for office.

As a class, the children of presidents have also occasioned significant study. Study has generally followed two paths: The issue of what access and inclusion within the circles of power does to individuals' lives, aspirations, and outcomes; and the issue of their influence on society and politics.

== 18th century ==
=== George and Martha Washington ===
They had no biological children together. Martha Washington had four children with Daniel Parke Custis.

Child		Lifetime	Spouse	Notes
	Daniel Parke Custis Jr.	November 19, 1751 – February 19, 1754 (aged 2)	No spouse	Posthumous stepson; died before Martha Custis' marriage to George Washington.
	Frances Parke Custis	April 12, 1753 – April 1, 1757 (aged 3)	No spouse	Posthumous stepdaughter; died before Martha Custis' marriage to George Washington.
John Parke Custis	John Parke "Jacky" Custis	November 27, 1754 – November 5, 1781 (aged 26)	Eleanor Calvert	Stepson. Died from "camp fever" while serving in the American Revolutionary War. Father of: Unnamed (1775); Elizabeth Parke Custis Law (1776–1831); Martha Parke Custis Peter (1777–1854); Eleanor Parke Custis Lewis (1779–1852); Unnamed Twins (1780); George Washington Parke Custis (1781–1857)
Patsy Parke Custis	Martha Parke "Patsy" Custis	1756 – June 19, 1773 (aged 17)	No spouse	Stepdaughter. Died from an epileptic seizure.

=== Alleged illegitimate children of George Washington ===
Child	Lifetime	Spouse	Notes
Thomas Posey	June 9, 1750 – March 19, 1818 (aged 67)	Martha Mathews	Posey's parentage is unclear. According to rumors, Posey was born out of wedlock to the widow of George Harrison and was adopted by her second husband John Posey; that he was the illegitimate child of John Posey and another woman; or that he might have been the natural son of seventeen-year-old George Washington and an unnamed "Low Land Beauty" who was raised by the Poseys.
Thomas Posey	June 9, 1750 – March 19, 1818 (aged 67)	Mary Alexander Thornton	Posey's parentage is unclear. According to rumors, Posey was born out of wedlock to the widow of George Harrison and was adopted by her second husband John Posey; that he was the illegitimate child of John Posey and another woman; or that he might have been the natural son of seventeen-year-old George Washington and an unnamed "Low Land Beauty" who was raised by the Poseys.
West Ford	c. 1784 – July 20, 1863 (aged 78–79)		Caretaker at Mount Vernon; descendants assert Washington was his father, see West Ford § Washington fatherhood controversy

=== John and Abigail Adams ===
Child		Lifetime	Spouse	Notes
Nabby Smith	Abigail Adams; Nickname: Nabby or Amelia	July 14, 1765 – August 15, 1813 (aged 48)	William Stephens Smith	Earliest confirmed biological child of a president of the United States. Mother of: William Steuben Smith (1787–1850); John Adams Smith (1788–1854); Thomas Hollis Smith (1790–1791); Caroline Amelia Smith (1795–1852)
J.Q. Adams	John Quincy Adams; 6th president (1825–1829)	July 11, 1767 – February 23, 1848 (aged 80)	Louisa Catherine Johnson	6th president of the United States, see below at John Quincy and Louisa Adams
	Susanna "Suky" Adams	December 28, 1768 – February 4, 1770 (aged 1)	No spouse	Died of an unknown illness
Charles Adams	Charles Adams	May 29, 1770 – November 30, 1800 (aged 30)	Sarah Smith	Died likely of pleurisy; the first first child to die during their parent's presidency. Father of: Susanna Boylston Adams (1796–1884); Abigail Louisa Smith Adams (1798–1836)
Thomas Boylston Adams	Thomas Boylston Adams	September 15, 1772 – March 13, 1832 (aged 59)	Ann Harrod	Father of: Abigail Smith Adams (1806–1845); Thomas Boylston Adams (1809–1837); Elizabeth Coombs Adams (1809–1903); Frances Foster Adams (1811–1812); Isaac Hull Adams (1813–1900); John Quincy Adams (1815–1854); Joseph Harrod Adams (1817–1853)
	Elizabeth Adams	July 11, 1777	No spouse	Stillborn

== 19th century ==
=== Thomas and Martha Jefferson ===
Child		Lifetime	Spouse	Notes
	John Skelton	November 7, 1767 – June 10, 1771 (aged 3)	No spouse	Posthumous stepson; died before Martha Skelton's marriage to Jefferson. Fathered by her first husband, Bathurst Skelton.
Patsy Randolph	Martha "Patsy" Jefferson	September 27, 1772 – October 10, 1836 (aged 64)	Thomas Mann Randolph Jr.	Mother of: Ann Cary Randolph (1791–1826); Thomas Jefferson Randolph (1792–1875); Ellen Wayles Randolph (1794–1795) (Died in infancy due to a fatal illness. Her parents later gave her full name to their next child and daughter born in 1796.); Ellen Wayles Randolph (1796–1876); Cornelia Jefferson Randolph (1799–1871); Virginia Jefferson Randolph (1801–1881); Mary Jefferson Randolph (1803–1876); James Madison Randolph (1806–1834); Benjamin Franklin Randolph (1808–1871); Meriwether Lewis Randolph (1810–1837); Septimia Anne Randolph (1814–1887); George Wythe Randolph (1818–1867)
	Jane Randolph Jefferson	April 3, 1774 – September 1775 (aged 1)	No spouse	Died of unknown causes
	Unnamed infant	May 28, 1777 – June 14, 1777 (aged 17 days)	No spouse	Died in infancy
	Mary Jefferson; Nickname: Polly or Maria	August 1, 1778 – April 17, 1804 (aged 25)	John Wayles Eppes	Mother of: Baby Girl Eppes (1799–1800); Francis Wayles Eppes (1801–1881); Maria Jefferson Eppes (1804–1806)
	Lucy Elizabeth Jefferson (I)	November 30, 1780 – April 15, 1781 (aged 4 months)	No spouse	Died of an unspecified illness
	Lucy Elizabeth Jefferson (II)	May 8, 1782 – c. October 13, 1784 (aged 2)	No spouse	Died of whooping cough

=== Thomas Jefferson and Sally Hemings (enslaved concubine) ===
Children with Sally Hemings; see Jefferson DNA data.

Child	Lifetime	Spouse	Notes
Harriet Hemings (I)	October 5, 1795 – December 7, 1797 (aged 2)	No spouse	Died of unknown causes
William Beverly Hemings	April 1, 1798 – fl. 1822	A white woman in Maryland	One daughter, unnamed
Hemings	c. December 7, 1799 – c. 1800	No spouse	Died in early childhood
Harriet Hemings (II)	May 22, 1801 – fl. 1822	Unknown	Unknown
Madison Hemings	January 18, 1805 – November 26, 1877 (aged 72)	Mary Hughes McCoy	Father of: Hemings; Sarah Hemings (1835–1884); Thomas Eston Hemings (1839–1865); Harriet Hemings (1842–1926); Mary Ann Hemings (1843–1921); Catherine Jane Hemings (1844–1880); William Beverly Hemings (1847–1910); James Madison Hemings (1849–1922); Julia Ann Hemings (1851–1867); Ellen Wayles Hemings (1856–1940)
Eston Hemings	May 21, 1808 – January 3, 1856 (aged 47)	Julia Ann Isaacs	Father of: John Wayles Jefferson (1835–1892); Anna Wayles Jefferson (1837–1866); Beverly Frederick Jefferson (1839–1908)

Thomas Woodson, the father of Lewis Woodson and Sarah Jane Woodson, was also claimed to be a child of Thomas Jefferson and Sally Hemings. However, DNA testing of the male Jefferson line and the male Woodson line showed no link.

=== James and Dolley Madison ===
No children together, but raised the older of Dolley's two sons from her first marriage to John Todd.

Child		Lifetime	Spouse	Notes
John Payne Todd	John Payne "Payne" Todd	February 29, 1792 – January 16, 1852 (aged 59)	No spouse	Stepson raised by James Madison; father was John Todd Jr.
	William Temple Todd	July 4, 1793 – October 14, 1793 (aged 3 months)	No spouse	Posthumous stepson; died of yellow fever, along with his biological father, in the 1793 Philadelphia yellow fever epidemic

=== James and Elizabeth Monroe ===
Child		Lifetime	Spouse	Notes
Elizabeth Kortright Monroe	Elizabeth Kortright "Eliza" Monroe	December 1786 – January 27, 1840 (aged 53)	George Hay	Mother of Hortensia Monroe Hay (1809–1834)
	James Spence Monroe	May 1799 – September 28, 1800 (aged 1) (Note: James Monroe wrote that his only son died on September 28, 1800. The date of September 28, 1801 that is said to appear on the James Spence Monroe cenotaph in the St. John's Episcopal Church (Richmond, Virginia) churchyard is not contemporaneous to the child's death, the location of the actual grave remains unknown.)	No spouse	Died after "several days sickness"
Maria Hester Monroe	Maria Hester Monroe	April 8, 1802 – June 20, 1850 (aged 48)	Samuel Laurence Gouverneur	Mother of: Hester Gouverneur (1821); James Monroe Gouverneur (1822–1885); Elizabeth Kortright Gouverneur (1824–1868); Samuel Laurence Gouverneur Jr. (1826–1880)

=== John Quincy and Louisa Adams ===
Child		Lifetime	Spouse	Notes
George Washington Adams	George Washington Adams	April 12, 1801 – April 30, 1829 (aged 28)	None (Note: He had a mistress, Eliza Dolph, who had a child, but it is unclear who the baby's father was.)	Jumped off of a boat and drowned, believed to have been a suicide.
John Adams II	John Adams II	July 4, 1803 – October 23, 1834 (aged 31)	Mary Catherine Hellen	Father of: Mary Louisa Adams (December 2, 1828 – July 16, 1859); Georgiana Frances Adams (September 10, 1830 – November 20, 1839)
Unknown identity		June 22, 1806	No spouse	Stillborn
Charles Adams	Charles Francis Adams Sr.	August 18, 1807 – November 21, 1886 (aged 79)	Abigail Brown Brooks	Served as Ambassador to the United Kingdom (1861–1868); Father of: Louisa Catherine Adams (1831–1870); John Quincy Adams II (1833–1894); Charles Francis Adams Jr. (1835–1915); Henry Brooks Adams (1838–1918); Arthur Adams (1841–1846); Mary Gardiner Adams (1845–1928); Peter Chardon Brooks Adams (1848–1927)
	Louisa Catherine Adams	August 12, 1811 – September 15, 1812 (aged 1)	No spouse	Died in Saint Petersburg, Russia, from an unknown illness while her father was serving as Minister to Russia

=== Andrew and Rachel Jackson ===
No biological children together, informally "adopted" four. Andrew and Rachel also served as guardians to at least eight other children, and there are at least 38 individuals who could be considered wards of Andrew Jackson. According to researcher Rachel Meredith, "Andrew Jr. was the only ward that he and Rachel considered to be a child of theirs." Andrew Jackson Jr. is the only person listed as a descendant of Andrew and Rachel in family trees included in volume one of The Papers of Andrew Jackson and in Robert V. Remini's biographies.

Child		Lifetime	Spouse	Notes
Andrew Jackson Jr.	Andrew Jackson Jr.	December 4, 1808 – April 17, 1865 (aged 56)	Sarah Yorke	Biological child of Rachel's brother Severn Donelson; born a twin and adopted in infancy. Died of tetanus contracted in hunting accident. Father of five: Rachel Jackson Lawrence (1832–1923); Andrew Jackson III (1834–1906); Samuel Jackson (1837–1863); Thomas Jefferson Jackson (1841–1841); Robert Armstrong Jackson (1843–1843)
	Theodore	c. 1813 – before March 1814		Muscogee, possibly taken prisoner at Littafuchee, sent to live at the Hermitage as a companion for Andrew Jackson Jr.
	Charley	fl. February – April 1814		Indigenous or mixed-race orphan, tribal affiliation unknown; Charley was given to Jackson, perhaps as a tribute, and he was sent to live at the Hermitage as a companion to Andrew Jackson Donelson
Lyncoya Jackson	Lyncoya Jackson	c. 1811 – July 1, 1828 (aged 16)	No spouse, no children	Muscogee survivor of the Battle of Tallushatchee; died of tuberculosis.
	John Samuel Donelson	Before 1805–1817	No spouse, no children	Orphaned nephews of Rachel, sons of Samuel Donelson who died in 1804. Major General Daniel Smith Donelson died from chronic diarrhea outside of combat.
Andrew Jackson Donelson	Andrew Jackson Donelson	August 25, 1799 – June 26, 1871 (aged 71)	Emily Tennessee Donelson	Orphaned nephews of Rachel, sons of Samuel Donelson who died in 1804. Major General Daniel Smith Donelson died from chronic diarrhea outside of combat.
Andrew Jackson Donelson	Andrew Jackson Donelson	August 25, 1799 – June 26, 1871 (aged 71)	Elizabeth Martin Randolph	Orphaned nephews of Rachel, sons of Samuel Donelson who died in 1804. Major General Daniel Smith Donelson died from chronic diarrhea outside of combat.
Daniel Smith Donelson	Daniel Smith Donelson	June 23, 1801 – April 17, 1863 (aged 61)	Margaret Donelson	Orphaned nephews of Rachel, sons of Samuel Donelson who died in 1804. Major General Daniel Smith Donelson died from chronic diarrhea outside of combat.
John Hutchings Jr.	Andrew Jackson Hutchings	1812 – 1841 (aged 28–29)	Mary Coffee	Orphaned grandnephew of Rachel
	Caroline Swanwick Butler	1789 – 1864 (aged 74–75)	Robert G. Bell	Orphaned children of family friend Edward Butler
	Eliza Eleanor Butler	April 20, 1791 – November 4, 1850 (aged 59)	John Donelson IV (1787–1840) (Note: John Donelson IV was a nephew of Rachel Donelson Jackson, son of John Donelson III and Mary Purnell.)	Orphaned children of family friend Edward Butler
Edward G. W. Butler	Edward George Washington Butler	February 22, 1800 – September 5, 1888 (aged 88)	Frances Parke Lewis (Note: Frances Parke Lewis was the step great-granddaughter of George Washington)	Orphaned children of family friend Edward Butler
	Anthony Wayne Butler	1803 – September 1824 (aged 20–21)	No spouse, no children	Orphaned children of family friend Edward Butler

=== Martin and Hannah Van Buren ===
Child		Lifetime	Spouse	Notes
Abraham Van Buren	Abraham Van Buren II	November 27, 1807 – March 15, 1873 (aged 65)	Angelica Singleton	Father of: Rebecca Van Buren (1840-1840); Singleton Van Buren (1841–1879); Infant Son Van Buren (1843-1843); Martin Van Buren II (1844–1885); Travis Coles Van Buren (1849–1889)
John Van Buren	John Van Buren	February 18, 1810 – October 13, 1866 (aged 56)	Elizabeth Vanderpoel	Father of: Anna Van Buren (1842–1923)
	Martin "Matt" Van Buren Jr.	December 20, 1812 – March 19, 1855 (aged 42)	No spouse and no children	Died of tuberculosis
	Winfield Scott Van Buren	1814	No spouse and no children	Died in infancy
	Smith Thompson Van Buren	January 16, 1817 – December 10, 1876 (aged 59)	Ellen King James	7 children between 2 wives
	Smith Thompson Van Buren	January 16, 1817 – December 10, 1876 (aged 59)	Henrietta Eckford Irving	7 children between 2 wives
		c. 1807 or c. 1818	No spouse	Stillborn

=== William Henry and Anna Harrison ===
Child		Lifetime	Spouse	Notes
	Elizabeth Bassett "Betsy" Harrison	September 29, 1796 – September 27, 1846 (aged 49)	John Cleves Short	Mother of: Mary Short (1815–1816)
	John Cleves Symmes Harrison	October 28, 1798 – October 30, 1830 (aged 32)	Clarissa Pike (Note: Clarissa Pike was the daughter of Zebulon Pike, who discovered Pike's Peak)	Father of: Zebuline Adeline Pike Harrison (1821–1849); Anna Maria Symmes Harrison (1822–1849); Clara Harrison (1824–1883); Montgomery Pike Harrison (1826–1849); William Henry Harrison (1828–1900)
	Lucy Singleton Harrison	September 1800 – April 7, 1826 (aged 25)	David K. Este	Mother of: William Harrison Este (1820-1820); Lucy Ann Harrison Este (1822–1868); David Este (1826-1826)
	William Henry Harrison Jr.	September 3, 1802 – February 6, 1838 (aged 35)	Jane Findlay Irwin	Father of: Adeline Harrison (1823–1869); James Findlay Harrison (1825–1907); William Henry Harrison III (1826–1904)
John Harrison	John Scott Harrison	October 4, 1804 – May 25, 1878 (aged 73)	Lucretia Knapp Johnson	Father of: Elizabeth Short Harrison (1825–1904); William Henry Harrison (1827–1829); Sarah Lucretia Harrison (1829–1917)
John Harrison	John Scott Harrison	October 4, 1804 – May 25, 1878 (aged 73)	Elizabeth Ramsey Irwin	Mother of: Archibald Irwin Harrison (1832–1870); 23rd president (1889–1893) Benjamin Harrison (1833–1901); Mary Jane Harrison (1836–1867); Anne Symmes Harrison (1837–1838); John Irwin Harrison (1839-1839); Carter Bassett Harrison (1840–1905); Anna Symmes Harrison (1842–1926); John Scott Harrison (1844–1926); James Findlay Harrison (1847–1848); James Irwin Harrison (1849–1850)
	Benjamin Harrison	8 September 1806 – June 9, 1840 (aged 33)	Louisa Smith Bonner	John Cleves Short Harrison (1829-1904)
	Benjamin Harrison	8 September 1806 – June 9, 1840 (aged 33)	Mary Raney	Benjamin Harrison Jr. (1837-1854) William Henry Harrison (1839-1850)
	Mary Symmes Harrison	January 22, 1809 – November 16, 1842 (aged 33)	John Henry Fitzhugh Thornton	William Henry Thornton (1830-1903); Charles F Thornton (1832-1868); Anna Harrison Thornton (1835-1883); Lucy Harrison Thornton (1837-1840); Alice Elizabeth Thornton (1839-1920); John H Thornton (1841-1907)
	Carter Bassett Harrison	October 26, 1811 – August 12, 1839 (aged 27)	Mary Anne Sutherland	Anna Harrison McClung (1837-1924)
	Anna Tuthill Harrison	October 28, 1813 – July 5, 1865 (aged 51)	William Henry Harrison Taylor (Note: William Henry Harrison Taylor was Anna Tuthill Harrison's cousin)	William Henry Taylor Jr. (1837-1906); Lucy Singleton Taylor Howell (1838-1906); John Thomas Taylor (1841-1926); Mary Thornton Taylor Plummer (1843-1905); Anna Cleves Taylor Comstock (1844-1936); Bessie Short Taylor Ogden (1846-1940); Florence Galt Taylor Hendryx (1848-1930)
	James Findlay Harrison	June 21, 1818 – April 6, 1819 (aged 0)	No spouse	Died of unknown causes

=== William Henry Harrison and Dilsia (enslaved concubine) ===
Paternity unconfirmed as of 2024.

Child	Lifetime	Spouse	Notes
Dilsia Harrison	1809 – before 1900	Unknown	Daughter conceived by one of his slaves
Harrison ♀️ (I)			
Harrison ♀️ (II)			
Harrison ♀️ (III)			
Harrison ♀️ (IV)			
Marie Harrison	1840 – 1875 (aged 34–35)	No spouse	Had 4 children with Augustus C. Ware (1830–1872). Grandmother of Walter Francis White, head of the NAACP

=== John and Letitia Tyler ===
Child	Lifetime	Spouse	Notes
Mary Tyler	April 15, 1815 – June 17, 1847 (aged 32)	Henry Lightfoot Jones	Mother of: John Tyler Jones (1836–1898); Robert Tyler Jones (1843–1895)
Robert Tyler	September 9, 1816 – December 3, 1877 (aged 61)	Elizabeth Priscilla Cooper	8 children
John Tyler Jr.	April 27, 1819 – January 26, 1896 (aged 76)	Martha Rochelle	3 children
Letitia Christian "Letty" Tyler	May 11, 1821 – December 28, 1907 (aged 86)	James Allen Semple	No children
Elizabeth "Lizzie" Tyler	July 11, 1823 – June 1, 1850 (aged 26)	William Nevison Waller	5 children
Anne Contesse Tyler	April 5, 1825 – July 1825 (aged 2–3 months)	No spouse	Died in infancy
Alice Tyler	March 23, 1827 – June 8, 1854 (aged 27)	Henry Mandeville Denison	1 daughter
Tazewell Tyler	January 8, 1830 – January 8, 1874 (aged 43)	Nannie Bridges	1 daughter

==== John Tyler and multiple unidentified enslaved concubines ====
Paternity unconfirmed as of 2024. Abolitionist Joshua Leavitt reported the information about John Tyler and Charles Tyler. The claim that Tyler had fathered multiple children with slaves was largely ignored by 19th-century historians. In addition to the Dunjees, the Brown family of Charles City County claims descent from Tyler by an enslaved concubine. Biographer Edward P. Crapol states that Tyler's white descendants are skeptical of claims by the Browns. However, per Crapol, in light of the resolution of the Hemings–Jefferson controversy in favor of Hemings descendants, "claims that John Tyler fathered children by his slaves must be taken seriously and examined thoroughly."

Child		Lifetime	Spouse	Notes
	Charles Tyler	Born c. 1810–1820? (est.)		Per Leavitt, escaped to Canada through Poughkeepsie, eventually moved to England as a servant of Governor-General John Lambton, 1st Earl of Durham
	John Tyler	Born c. 1815–1830? (est.)		Per Leavitt by way of a Baptist minister, John Tyler the younger had been sold out of Williamsburg to a new owner in Richmond; he claimed that he was one of several children Tyler fathered with his mother but "I reckon they are all sold before now."
John Dunjee	John William Dunjee	1833 – April 19, 1903 (aged 69–70)	Lydia Ann Taylor	Allegedly the son of John Tyler; Father of: Drusilla Dunjee Houston (1876–1941); Roscoe Dunjee (1883–1965)

=== John and Julia Tyler ===
Child		Lifetime	Spouse	Notes
Gardie Tyler	David Gardiner "Gardie" Tyler	July 12, 1846 – September 5, 1927 (aged 81)	Mary Morris Jones	5 children
	John Alexander "Alex" Tyler	April 7, 1848 – September 1, 1883 (aged 35)	Sarah Griswold Gardiner	2 children
	Julia Gardiner Tyler	December 25, 1849 – May 8, 1871 (aged 21)	William H. Spencer	Julia Tyler Spencer Cheever (1871–1955)
	Lachlan Tyler	December 2, 1851 – January 26, 1902 (aged 50)	Georgia Webb Powell	No children
Lyon Tyler	Lyon Gardiner Tyler	August 24, 1853 – February 12, 1935 (aged 81)	Anne Baker Tucker	Father of: Julia Gardiner Tyler (1881–1965); Elizabeth Gilmour Tyler (1885–1976); John Tyler (1889–1969)
Lyon Tyler	Lyon Gardiner Tyler	August 24, 1853 – February 12, 1935 (aged 81)	Sue Ruffin	Father of: Lyon Gardiner Tyler Jr. (1925–2020); Harrison Ruffin Tyler (1928–2025); Henry Tyler (1931)
	Robert Fitzwalter Tyler	March 12, 1856 – December 30, 1927 (aged 71)	Fannie Glenn	At least 3 children
	Margaret Pearl Tyler	June 20, 1860 – June 30, 1947 (aged 87)	William Munford Ellis	8 children

=== James and Sarah Polk ===
The Polks remain the only presidential couple to never have children (biologically, adopted, or from previous marriage).

Child		Lifetime	Spouse	Notes
Marshal Polk	Marshall Tate Polk Jr.	May 15, 1831 – February 29, 1884 (aged 52)	Evalina McNeal Bills	Guardianship/legal ward, nephew, son of brother Marshall Tate Polk
Sarah Polk Fall	Sarah Polk Fall	April 1, 1847 – July 22, 1924 (aged 77)	George William Fall	Legal ward, shortly after the death of the president his widow unofficially adopted a great niece

=== Zachary and Margaret Taylor ===
Child		Lifetime	Spouse	Notes
	Ann Mackall Taylor	April 9, 1811 – December 2, 1875 (aged 64)	Dr. Robert Crooke Wood	Mother of 4, including John Taylor Wood (1830–1904)
Sarah Taylor	Sarah Knox "Knoxie" Taylor	March 6, 1814 – September 15, 1835 (aged 21)	Jefferson F. Davis	Died from malaria as a newlywed
	Octavia Pannel Taylor (Note: Some sources spell this name as Octavia Pannill Taylor.)	August 16, 1816 – September 3, 1820 (aged 4)	No spouse	Died from malaria (Note: Octavia's illness was described by her father as "bilious fever.")
	Margaret Smith Taylor	July 17, 1819 – October 1820 (aged 1)	No spouse	Died from malaria (Note: Margaret's illness was described by her father as "bilious fever.")
Mary Taylor Bliss	Mary Elizabeth "Betty" Taylor	April 20, 1824 – July 25, 1909 (aged 85)	William Wallace Smith Bliss	Betty Bliss served as President Taylor's White House hostess, as the First Lady was an invalid.
Mary Taylor Bliss	Mary Elizabeth "Betty" Taylor	April 20, 1824 – July 25, 1909 (aged 85)	Philip Pendleton Dandridge	Betty Bliss served as President Taylor's White House hostess, as the First Lady was an invalid.
Richard Taylor	Richard "Dick" Taylor	January 27, 1826 – April 17, 1879 (aged 53)	Louise Marie Myrthe Bringier	Father of Richard, Zachary, Louise, Elizabeth, and Myrthe

=== Millard and Abigail Fillmore ===
Child		Lifetime	Spouse	Notes
Millard Powers Fillmore	Millard Powers "Powers" Fillmore	April 25, 1828 – November 15, 1889 (aged 61)	No spouse and no children	Last living descendant of President Fillmore
Abby Fillmore	Mary Abigail "Abby" Fillmore	March 27, 1832 – July 26, 1854 (aged 22)	No spouse and no children	Served as unofficial acting first lady during her mother's illness. Died of cholera

Fillmore's second wife was Caroline Fillmore but they had no children.

=== Franklin and Jane Pierce ===
Child		Lifetime	Spouse	Notes
	Franklin Pierce Jr.	February 2, 1836 – February 5, 1836 (aged 2 days)	No spouse	Died from complications to his birth
	Frank Robert Pierce	August 27, 1839 – November 14, 1843 (aged 4)	No spouse	Died of typhus after contracting it along with his brother
Benjamin Pierce with his mother Jane	Benjamin "Benny" Pierce	April 13, 1841 – January 6, 1853 (aged 11)	No spouse	Died in a train accident in front of his parents, weeks before his father was inaugurated

=== James Buchanan ===
Buchanan never married or had children; he served as legal guardian of two nieces.

Child		Lifetime	Spouse	Notes
	Mary Elizabeth Speer Lane	1826 – 1855 (aged 28–29)	George Washington Baker	Adopted daughter; niece (daughter of sister Jane Buchanan and Elliot Tole Lane)
Harriet Lane	Harriet Rebecca Lane	May 9, 1830 – July 3, 1903 (aged 73)	Henry Elliott Johnston	Adopted daughter; niece (daughter of sister Jane Buchanan and Elliot Tole Lane); served as Acting First Lady Mother of: James Buchanan Johnston (1866–1881); Henry Elliott Johnston (1870–1882)

=== Abraham and Mary Lincoln ===
Child		Lifetime	Spouse	Notes
Robert Lincoln	Robert Todd Lincoln	August 1, 1843 – July 26, 1926 (aged 82)	Mary Eunice Harlan	Served as Secretary of War under the administrations of James A. Garfield and Chester A. Arthur. Father of: Mary Todd Lincoln (1869–1938); Abraham Lincoln II (1873–1890); Jessie Harlan Lincoln (1875–1948)
Eddie Lincoln	Edward Baker "Eddie" Lincoln	March 10, 1846 – February 1, 1850 (aged 3)	No spouse	Died of "chronic consumption".
Willie Lincoln	William Wallace "Willie" Lincoln	December 21, 1850 – February 20, 1862 (aged 11)	No spouse	Died from typhoid fever.
Tad Lincoln	Thomas "Tad" Lincoln III	April 4, 1853 – July 15, 1871 (aged 18)	No spouse	The cause of Tad Lincoln's death has been reported as possibly any one of the following: tuberculosis, pleuristic attack, pneumonia; congestive heart failure

=== Andrew and Eliza Johnson ===
Child		Lifetime	Spouse	Notes
Martha Johnson	Martha Johnson	October 25, 1828 – July 10, 1901 (aged 72)	David Trotter Patterson	Martha Johnson Patterson § Descendants: Andrew Johnson Patterson (1857–1932); Mary Belle Patterson Landstreet (1859–1891)
Charles Johnson	Charles Johnson	February 19, 1830 – April 4, 1863 (aged 33)	No spouse and no children	Died while enlisted in American Civil War from horse-related violence.
Mary Johnson Stover Brown	Mary Johnson	May 8, 1832 – April 19, 1883 (aged 50)	Daniel Stover	Mary Johnson Stover § Descendants: Eliza Johnson "Lillie" Stover Maloney (1855–1892); Sarah Drake Stover Bachman (1857–1886); Andrew Johnson Stover (1860–1923)
Mary Johnson Stover Brown	Mary Johnson	May 8, 1832 – April 19, 1883 (aged 50)	William R. Brown	Mary Johnson Stover § Descendants: Eliza Johnson "Lillie" Stover Maloney (1855–1892); Sarah Drake Stover Bachman (1857–1886); Andrew Johnson Stover (1860–1923)
Robert Johnson	Robert Johnson	February 22, 1834 – April 22, 1869 (aged 35)	No spouse and no children	
	Andrew "Frank" Johnson Jr.	August 5, 1852 – March 12, 1879 (aged 26)	Bessie May Rumbough	No children

=== Andrew and Dolly Johnson (enslaved concubine) ===
Andrew Johnson has been theorized to be the father of Liz, Florence, and William Andrew by Dolly Johnson, though there is no concrete evidence proving he was or not; paternity not confirmed as of 2024.

Child		Lifetime	Spouse	Notes
	Elizabeth Johnson Forby	March 1846 – October 3, 1905 (aged 59)	George Forby	Mother of nine children (Elizabeth Johnson Forby § Descendants)
Florence Johnson	Florence Johnson Smith	May 1850 – September 5, 1920 (aged 70)	Henry Smith	Mother of four children (Florence Johnson Smith § Descendants)
William Andrew Johnson	William Andrew Johnson	February 8, 1858 – May 16, 1943 (aged 85)	No spouse and no children	Andrew Johnson's son Robert Johnson is listed as "father" on William Andrew Johnson's death certificate. (Note: Though Andrew Johnson's son Robert was listed on William Andrew Johnson's death certificate as being William Andrew's father, many historians theorize that Andrew Johnson was the actual father of William Andrew Johnson.)

=== Ulysses and Julia Grant ===
Child		Lifetime	Spouse	Notes
Frederick Grant	Frederick Dent Grant	May 30, 1850 – April 12, 1912 (aged 61)	Ida Marie Honoré	Father of: Julia Grant (1876–1975); Ulysses Simpson Grant III (1881–1968)
Buck Grant	Ulysses S. "Buck" Grant Jr.	July 22, 1852 – September 25, 1929 (aged 77)	Frances Josephine "Fannie" Chaffee	Father of 5: Miriam Grant (1881–1940); Chaffee Grant (1883–1940); Julia Dent Grant (1885–1964); Fannie Grant (1889–1924); Ulysses Simpson Grant IV (1893–1977)
Buck Grant	Ulysses S. "Buck" Grant Jr.	July 22, 1852 – September 25, 1929 (aged 77)	America Rosa Workman Will	No children
Nellie Grant	Ellen Wrenshall "Nellie" Grant	July 4, 1855 – August 30, 1922 (aged 67)	Algernon Charles Frederick Sartoris	Mother of: Grant Grenville Edward Sartoris (1875–1876); Algernon Edward Sartoris (1877–1928); Vivien May Sartoris (1879–1933); Rosemary Alice Sartoris (1880–1914)
Nellie Grant	Ellen Wrenshall "Nellie" Grant	July 4, 1855 – August 30, 1922 (aged 67)	Frank Hatch Jones	No children
Jesse Root Grant	Jesse Root Grant II	February 6, 1858 – June 8, 1934 (aged 76)	Elizabeth Mary Chapman	Father of: Nellie Grant (1881–1972); Chapman Grant (1887–1983)
Jesse Root Grant	Jesse Root Grant II	February 6, 1858 – June 8, 1934 (aged 76)	Lillian Burns Wilkins	No children

=== Rutherford and Lucy Hayes ===
Child		Lifetime	Spouse	Notes
	Birchard Austin Hayes	November 4, 1853 – January 24, 1926 (aged 72)	Mary Nancy Sherman	Father of: Rutherford Birchard Hayes (1887–1888); Sherman Otis Hayes (1889–1949); Webb Cook Hayes II (1890–1957); Walter Sherman Hayes (1893–1976); Scott Russell Hayes (1894–1968)
Webb Hayes	James Webb Cook "Webb" Hayes	March 20, 1856 – July 26, 1934 (aged 78)	Mary Otis Brinkerhoff Miller	No children
Rutherford Platt Hayes	Rutherford Platt Hayes	June 24, 1858 – July 31, 1927 (aged 69)	Lucy Hayes Platt	Father of; Rutherford Birchard Hayes (1896–1902); William Platt Hayes (1897–1976); Birchard Platt Hayes (1902–1958)
	Joseph Thompson "Jody" Hayes	December 21, 1861 – June 24, 1863 (aged 1)	No spouse	Died of dysentery
	George Crook Hayes	September 29, 1864 – May 4, 1866 (aged 1)	No spouse	Died of scarlet fever
	Frances "Fanny" Hayes	September 2, 1867 – March 18, 1950 (aged 82)	Harry Eaton Smith	1 child; Dalton Smith Hayes (1898–1950)
Scott Russell Hayes	Scott Russell Hayes	February 8, 1871 – May 6, 1923 (aged 52)	Maude Anderson	No children
	Manning Force Hayes	August 1, 1873 – August 28, 1874 (aged 1)	No spouse	Died in infancy, as a result of dysentery.

=== James and Lucretia Garfield ===
Child		Lifetime	Spouse	Notes
	Eliza Arabella "Trot" Garfield	July 3, 1860 – December 3, 1863 (aged 3)	No spouse	Died of diphtheria.
Hal Garfield	Harry Augustus "Hal" Garfield	October 11, 1863 – December 12, 1942 (aged 79)	Belle Hartford Mason	Father of 4 children: James Garfield (1889–1976); Mason Garfield (1892–1945); Lucretia Garfield (1894–1968); Stanton Garfield (1895–1979)
James Garfield	James Rudolph Garfield	October 17, 1865 – March 24, 1950 (aged 84)	Helen Newell	Was Secretary of the Interior during Theodore Roosevelt's administration. Father of: John Newell Garfield (1892–1931); James Abram Garfield (1894–1969); Newell Garfield (1895–1975); Rudolph Hills Garfield (1899–1946)
Mollie Garfield	Mary "Mollie" Garfield	January 16, 1867 – December 30, 1947 (aged 80)	Joseph Stanley-Brown	Mother of: Rudolph Stanley-Brown (1889–1944); Ruth Stanley-Brown (1892–1981); Margaret "Peggy" Stanley-Brown (1895–1958)
Irvin McDowell Garfield	Irvin McDowell Garfield	August 3, 1870 – July 18, 1951 (aged 80)	Susan Emmons	Father of 3: Eleanor Garfield (1908–2002); Jane Garfield (1910–2004); Irvin McDowell Garfield Jr. (1913–1985)
Abram Garfield	Abram Garfield	November 21, 1872 – October 16, 1958 (aged 85)	Sarah Granger Williams	Father of: Edward Williams Garfield (1899–1979); Mary Louise Garfield (1903–1991)
Abram Garfield	Abram Garfield	November 21, 1872 – October 16, 1958 (aged 85)	Helen Grannis Matthews	No children
	Edward Garfield	December 25, 1874 – October 25, 1876 (aged 1)	No spouse	Died of whooping cough.

=== Chester and Ellen Arthur ===
Child		Lifetime	Spouse	Notes
	William Lewis Arthur	October 10, 1860 – July 7, 1863 (aged 2)	No spouse	Died of convulsions.
Chester Alan Arthur II	Chester Alan "Alan" Arthur II	July 25, 1864 – July 18, 1937 (aged 72)	Myra Townsend	Father of: Chester Alan "Gavin" Arthur III (1901–1972); Ellen "Myra" Arthur (1904)
Chester Alan Arthur II	Chester Alan "Alan" Arthur II	July 25, 1864 – July 18, 1937 (aged 72)	Rowena Graves	Father of: Chester Alan "Gavin" Arthur III (1901–1972); Ellen "Myra" Arthur (1904)
Nellie Herndon Arthur	Ellen Hansbrough Herndon "Nell" Arthur	November 21, 1871 – September 6, 1915 (aged 43)	Charles Pinkerton	No children

=== Grover Cleveland and Maria Halpin ===
Child	Lifetime	Spouse	Notes
Dr. James Edward King Jr. Birth name: Oscar Folsom Cleveland	September 15, 1874 – March 9, 1947 (aged 72)	Rose A. Kleinschmidt Weber (divorced); no children	Alleged illegitimate son of Cleveland with Maria Halpin; adopted as a baby by the doctor who supervised the asylum where Halpin was confined during pregnancy.

=== Grover and Frances Cleveland ===
Child		Lifetime	Spouse	Notes
Ruth Cleveland	Ruth "Baby Ruth" Cleveland	October 3, 1891 – January 7, 1904 (aged 12)	No spouse	Died of diphtheria.
Esther Cleveland	Esther Cleveland	September 9, 1893 – June 25, 1980 (aged 86)	William Sydney Bence Bosanquet	Born during second presidency of Grover Cleveland. First presidential child to be born during a presidency, and only one born in the White House (owing epithet of the "White House Baby"). Mother of: Marion Frances Daniel, née Bosanquet (1919–2016); Philippa Foot, née Bosanquet (1920–2010)
Marion Cleveland	Marion Cleveland	July 7, 1895 – March 10, 1977 (aged 81)	William Stanley Dell	Born during second presidency of Grover Cleveland. Mother of Frances Folsom Dell (1920–2005).
Marion Cleveland	Marion Cleveland	July 7, 1895 – March 10, 1977 (aged 81)	John Harlan Amen	Mother of Grover Cleveland Amen (1932–1997)
Richard F. Cleveland	Richard Folsom "Dick" Cleveland	October 28, 1897 – January 10, 1974 (aged 76)	Ellen Douglas Gailor	Father of: Ann Mary Cleveland (1925–2015); Thomas Grover Cleveland (1927–2020); Charlotte Gailor Cleveland (1930–2007)
Richard F. Cleveland	Richard Folsom "Dick" Cleveland	October 28, 1897 – January 10, 1974 (aged 76)	Jessie Maxwell Black	Father of: Frances Black Cleveland (born 1946); George Maxwell Cleveland (born 1952); Margaret Folsom Cleveland (1956–2021)
	Francis Grover Cleveland	July 18, 1903 – November 8, 1995 (aged 92)	Alice Erdman	Father of Marion C. Cleveland (1925–2014)

=== Benjamin and Caroline Harrison ===
Child		Lifetime	Spouse	Notes
Russell Benjamin Harrison	Russell Benjamin Harrison	August 12, 1854 – December 13, 1936 (aged 82)	May Angeline Saunders	Born Russell Farnum Lord Harrison Father of: Marthena Serviller Harrison (1888–1972); William Henry Harrison III (1896–1990)
Mamie McKee	Mary Scott "Mamie" Harrison	April 3, 1858 – October 28, 1930 (aged 72)	James Robert McKee	Served as acting First Lady Mother of: Benjamin Harrison McKee (1887–1958); Mary Lodge McKee Reisinger (1888–1967)
	Unnamed daughter	June 13, 1861	No spouse	Stillborn

=== Benjamin and Mary Harrison ===
Child		Lifetime	Spouse	Notes
Elizabeth Harrison	Elizabeth Harrison Walker	February 21, 1897 – December 25, 1955 (aged 58)	James Blaine Walker	Mother of: Benjamin Harrison Walker (1921–1995); Jane Harrison Walker Garfield (1929–2020)

=== William and Ida McKinley ===
Child		Lifetime	Spouse	Notes
Katie McKinley	Katherine "Katie" McKinley	December 25, 1871 – June 25, 1875 (aged 3)	No spouse	Died of typhoid fever.
	Ida McKinley	April 1 – August 22, 1873 (aged 4 months)	No spouse	Died in infancy.

== 20th century ==
=== Theodore and Alice Roosevelt ===
Child		Lifetime	Spouse	Notes
Alice Roosevelt	Alice Lee Roosevelt; Nickname: Lee	February 12, 1884 – February 20, 1980 (aged 96)	Nicholas Longworth	Longest lived of any first child. Mother of Paulina Longworth (1925–1957), with William Borah.

=== Theodore and Edith Roosevelt ===
Child		Lifetime	Spouse	Notes
Ted Roosevelt	Theodore Roosevelt Jr. Nickname: Ted	September 13, 1887 – July 12, 1944 (aged 56)	Eleanor Butler Alexander	Governor-General of the Philippines, Governor of Puerto Rico, and Assistant Secretary of the Navy. Died from a heart attack outside of combat. Father of: Grace Roosevelt (1911–1994); Theodore Roosevelt III (1914–2001); Cornelius "Corney" Van Schaack Roosevelt (1915–1991); Quentin Roosevelt II (1919–1948)
Kermit Roosevelt	Kermit Roosevelt	October 10, 1889 – June 4, 1943 (aged 53)	Belle Wyatt Willard	Committed suicide while enlisted during World War II. Father of: Kermit "Kim" Roosevelt Jr. (1916–2000); Joseph Willard Roosevelt (1918–2008); Belle Wyatt Roosevelt (1919–1985); Dirck Roosevelt (1925–1953)
Ethel Roosevelt	Ethel Carow Roosevelt	August 13, 1891 – December 10, 1977 (aged 86)	Richard Derby	Mother of: Richard Derby Jr. (1914–1922); Edith Roosevelt Derby (1917–2008); Sarah Alden Derby (1920–1999); Judith Quentin Derby (1923–1973)
Archie Roosevelt	Archibald Bulloch Roosevelt; Nickname: Archie	April 10, 1894 – October 13, 1979 (aged 85)	Grace Lockwood	Father of: Archibald Bulloch Roosevelt Jr. (1918–1990); Theodora Roosevelt (1919–2008); Nancy Dabney Roosevelt (1923–2010); Edith Kermit Roosevelt (1927–2003)
Quentin Roosevelt	Quentin Roosevelt; Nickname: Quentyquee or Quinikins	November 19, 1897 – July 14, 1918 (aged 20)	No spouse and no children	Killed in aerial combat in World War I. While not the first or only First Child to die during military service, he was the only one to be killed in action.

=== William and Helen Taft ===
Child		Lifetime	Spouse	Notes
Robert Taft	Robert Alphonso Taft	September 8, 1889 – July 31, 1953 (aged 63)	Martha Wheaton Bowers	U.S. senator (1939–1953) and Senate majority leader (1953); Father of: William Howard Taft III (1915–1991); Robert A. Taft (1917–1993); Lloyd Bowers Taft (1923–1985); Horace Dwight Taft (1925–1983)
Helen Taft with her father	Helen Herron Taft; Nickname: Helene	August 1, 1891 – February 21, 1987 (aged 95)	Frederick Johnson Manning	Mother of: Helen Taft Manning (1921–2013); Caroline Manning (1925–2020)
Charles Taft with his father	Charles Phelps Taft II; Nickname: Charlie	September 20, 1897 – June 24, 1983 (aged 85)	Eleanor Kellogg Chase	Mayor of Cincinnati, Ohio; Father of: Eleanor Kellogg Taft (1918–2004); Sylvia Howard Taft (1920–2008); Seth Chase Taft (1922–2013); Lucia Chase Taft (1924–1955); Cynthia Herron Taft (1928–2013); Rosalyn Rawson Taft (1930–1941); Peter Rawson Taft III (born 1936)

=== Woodrow and Ellen Wilson ===
Child		Lifetime	Spouse	Notes
Margaret Wilson	Margaret Woodrow Wilson; Religious name: Sanskrit: निष्ठा, romanized: Nistha	April 16, 1886 – February 12, 1944 (aged 57)	No spouse	Served as acting first lady for a brief period. Emigrated to India for religious purposes, where she died of uremia.
Jessie Wilson	Jessie Woodrow Wilson	August 28, 1887 – January 15, 1933 (aged 45)	Francis Bowes Sayre Sr.	Mother of: Francis Bowes Sayre Jr. (1915–2008); Eleanor Axson Sayre (1916–2001); Woodrow Wilson Sayre (1919–2002)
Eleanor Wilson	Eleanor Randolph Wilson	October 16, 1889 – April 5, 1967 (aged 77)	William Gibbs McAdoo	Mother of: Ellen Wilson McAdoo (1915–1946); Mary Faith McAdoo (1920–1988)

Wilson's second wife Edith Wilson, with her first husband Norman Galt, had one son, who died in infancy before her marriage to Wilson.

=== Warren G. and Florence Harding ===
Child	Lifetime	Spouse	Notes
Marshall Eugene DeWolfe; Nickname: Pete	September 22, 1880 – January 1, 1915 (aged 34)	Esther Naomi Neely	Stepson from Florence's first marriage, to Henry Athenton DeWolfe; Father of: Eugenia DeWolfe (1911–1978); George Warren DeWolfe (1914–1968)

==== Warren G. Harding and Nan Britton ====
Child		Lifetime	Spouse	Notes
Elizabeth Ann Britton	Elizabeth Ann Britton; Nicknames: Emma, Ann	October 22, 1919 – November 17, 2005 (aged 86)	Henry Edward Blaesing	Illegitimate daughter of Warren G. Harding, proven by DNA testing in 2015 Mother of: Thomas Jay Blaesing (born 1947); James Edward Blaesing (born 1950); Philip Alan Blaesing (born 1954)

=== Calvin and Grace Coolidge ===
Child		Lifetime	Spouse	Notes
John Coolidge	John Coolidge	September 7, 1906 – May 31, 2000 (aged 93)	Florence Trumbull	Father of: Cynthia Coolidge Jeter (1933–1989); Lydia Coolidge Sayles (1939–2001)
Calvin Coolidge	Calvin Coolidge Jr.	April 13, 1908 – July 7, 1924 (aged 16)	No spouse	Died of blood poisoning

=== Herbert and Lou Hoover ===
Child	Lifetime	Spouse	Notes
Herbert Charles Hoover Jr.	August 4, 1903 – July 9, 1969 (aged 65)	Margaret Ava Watson	Served as Under Secretary of State (October 4, 1954 – February 5, 1957) in the Eisenhower administration Variously named as "Herbert Hoover, Jr.", "Herbert Charles Hoover", and "Herbert Clark Hoover" Father of: Margaret Ann Hoover (1926–2011); Herbert "Pete" Hoover III (1927–2010); Joan Leslie Hoover (1930–2002)
Allan Henry Hoover	July 17, 1907 – November 4, 1993 (aged 86)	Margaret Coberly	Father of: Allan Henry Hoover Jr. (1938–2013); Andrew Hoover (1940–2026); Lou Henry Hoover (1943–2012)

=== Franklin and Eleanor Roosevelt ===
Child		Lifetime	Spouse	Notes
Anna Roosevelt	Anna Eleanor Roosevelt	May 3, 1906 – December 1, 1975 (aged 69)	Curtis Bean Dall	Mother of: Anna Eleanor Roosevelt (born 1927); Curtis Roosevelt (1930–2016)
Anna Roosevelt	Anna Eleanor Roosevelt	May 3, 1906 – December 1, 1975 (aged 69)	Clarence John Boettiger	Mother of John Roosevelt Boettiger (born 1939)
Anna Roosevelt	Anna Eleanor Roosevelt	May 3, 1906 – December 1, 1975 (aged 69)	James Addison Halsted	No children with James Halsted
James Roosevelt II	James Roosevelt; Nickname: Jimmy	December 23, 1907 – August 13, 1991 (aged 83)	Betsey Maria Cushing	Father of: Sara Delano Roosevelt (1932–2021); Kate Roosevelt (born 1936)
James Roosevelt II	James Roosevelt; Nickname: Jimmy	December 23, 1907 – August 13, 1991 (aged 83)	Romelle Theresa Schneider	Father of: James Roosevelt Jr. (born 1945); Michael Anthony Roosevelt (born 1946); Anna Eleanor "Anne" Roosevelt (born 1948)
James Roosevelt II	James Roosevelt; Nickname: Jimmy	December 23, 1907 – August 13, 1991 (aged 83)	Gladys Irene Owens	Father of Hall Delano Roosevelt (born 1959)
James Roosevelt II	James Roosevelt; Nickname: Jimmy	December 23, 1907 – August 13, 1991 (aged 83)	Mary Lena Winskill	Father of Rebecca Mary Roosevelt (born 1971)
	Franklin Delano Roosevelt Jr. (I)	March 18, 1909 – November 8, 1909 (aged 7 months)	No spouse	Died as an infant.
Elliott Roosevelt	Elliott Roosevelt	September 23, 1910 – October 27, 1990 (aged 80)	Elizabeth Browning Donner	Father of William Donner Roosevelt (1932–2003)
Elliott Roosevelt	Elliott Roosevelt	September 23, 1910 – October 27, 1990 (aged 80)	Ruth Josephine Googins	Father of: Ruth "Lindsley" Chandler Roosevelt (1934–2018); Elliott "Tony" Roosevelt Jr. (born 1936); David Boynton Roosevelt (1942–2022)
Elliott Roosevelt	Elliott Roosevelt	September 23, 1910 – October 27, 1990 (aged 80)	Faye Margaret Emerson	No children with Faye Emerson
Elliott Roosevelt	Elliott Roosevelt	September 23, 1910 – October 27, 1990 (aged 80)	Minnewa Bell	No children with Minnewa Bell
Elliott Roosevelt	Elliott Roosevelt	September 23, 1910 – October 27, 1990 (aged 80)	Patricia Peabody Whitehead	Father of Livingston Delano Roosevelt (March 16–21, 1962). Adopted four stepchildren from Patricia Peabody Roosevelt's first marriage.
Franklin Roosevelt	Franklin Delano Roosevelt Jr. (II)	August 17, 1914 – August 17, 1988 (74th birthday)	Ethel du Pont	Father of: Franklin Delano Roosevelt III (born 1938); Christopher du Pont Roosevelt (born 1941)
Franklin Roosevelt	Franklin Delano Roosevelt Jr. (II)	August 17, 1914 – August 17, 1988 (74th birthday)	Suzanne Perrin	Father of: Nancy Suzanne Roosevelt (born 1952); Laura Delano Roosevelt (born 1959)
Franklin Roosevelt	Franklin Delano Roosevelt Jr. (II)	August 17, 1914 – August 17, 1988 (74th birthday)	Felicia Schiff Warburg	No children with Felicia Warburg Roosevelt
Franklin Roosevelt	Franklin Delano Roosevelt Jr. (II)	August 17, 1914 – August 17, 1988 (74th birthday)	Patricia Luisa Oakes	Father of John Alexander Roosevelt (born 1977)
Franklin Roosevelt	Franklin Delano Roosevelt Jr. (II)	August 17, 1914 – August 17, 1988 (74th birthday)	Linda McKay Stevenson	No children with Linda Stevenson Roosevelt
John Roosevelt	John Aspinwall Roosevelt II	March 13, 1916 – April 27, 1981 (aged 65)	Anne Lindsay Clark	Father of: Haven Clark Roosevelt (born 1940); Anne Sturgis "Nina" Roosevelt (born 1942); Sara Delano "Sally" Roosevelt (1946–1960); Joan Lindsay Roosevelt (1952–1997)
John Roosevelt	John Aspinwall Roosevelt II	March 13, 1916 – April 27, 1981 (aged 65)	Irene Elder Boyd	No children with Irene Boyd Roosevelt

=== Harry and Bess Truman ===
Child		Lifetime	Spouse	Note	Place of birth
Margaret Truman	Mary Margaret Truman	February 17, 1924 – January 29, 2008 (aged 83)	Elbert Clifton Daniel Jr.	Mother of: Clifton Truman Daniel (born 1957); William Wallace Daniel (1959–2000); Harrison Gates Daniel (born 1963); Thomas Washington Daniel (born 1966)	Independence, Missouri

=== Dwight and Mamie Eisenhower ===
Child		Lifetime	Spouse	Notes	Place of birth
Doud Eisenhower	Doud Dwight Eisenhower; Nickname: Icky	September 24, 1917 – January 2, 1921 (aged 3)	No spouse	Died of scarlet fever.	San Antonio, Texas
John Eisenhower	John Sheldon Doud Eisenhower	August 3, 1922 – December 21, 2013 (aged 91)	Barbara Jean Thompson	Ambassador to Belgium (1969–1971). Father of: Dwight David Eisenhower II (born 1948); Barbara Anne Eisenhower (1949–2022); Susan Elaine Eisenhower (born 1951); Mary Jean Eisenhower (born 1955)	Denver, Colorado
John Eisenhower	John Sheldon Doud Eisenhower	August 3, 1922 – December 21, 2013 (aged 91)	Joanne Thompson	No children	Denver, Colorado

=== John and Jacqueline Kennedy ===
Child		Lifetime	Spouse	Notes	Place of birth
Arabella Kennedy	Arabella Kennedy	August 23, 1956	No spouse	Stillborn daughter	Newport Hospital, Rhode Island
Caroline Kennedy	Caroline Bouvier Kennedy	Born November 27, 1957 (age 68)	Edwin Arthur Schlossberg	Ambassador to Japan (2013–2017) and Ambassador to Australia (2022–2024) Mother of: Rose Kennedy Schlossberg (born 1988); Tatiana Celia Kennedy Schlossberg (1990–2025); John Bouvier "Jack" Kennedy Schlossberg (born 1993)	Manhattan, New York
John Kennedy	John Fitzgerald Kennedy Jr. Nickname: John-John	November 25, 1960 – July 16, 1999 (aged 38)	Carolyn Jeanne Bessette	Killed in a plane crash. No children	Washington, D.C.
Patrick Bouvier Kennedy	Patrick Bouvier Kennedy	August 7, 1963 – August 9, 1963 (aged 39 hours)	No spouse	Died after a premature birth. The third First Child to have both been born during their parent's presidency, and only one to have died in said presidency.	Otis Air Force Base, Massachusetts

=== Lyndon and Lady Bird Johnson ===
Child		Lifetime	Spouse	Notes	Place of birth
Lynda Bird Robb	Lynda Bird Johnson	Born March 19, 1944 (age 82)	Charles Spittal Robb	Currently the oldest living presidential child. Mother of: Lucinda Desha Robb (born 1968); Catherine Lewis Robb (born 1970); Jennifer Wickliffe Robb (born 1978)	Washington, D.C.
Luci Johnson	Lucy Baines Johnson; Nickname: Luci	Born July 2, 1947 (age 79)	Patrick John Nugent	Mother of: Patrick Lyndon Nugent (born 1967); Nicole Marie Nugent (born 1970); Rebekah Johnson Nugent (born 1974); Claudia Taylor Nugent (born 1976)	Washington, D.C.
Luci Johnson	Lucy Baines Johnson; Nickname: Luci	Born July 2, 1947 (age 79)	Ian Johnstone Turpin	One stepson: Stuart Leonard Turpin (born 1978)	Washington, D.C.

=== Richard and Pat Nixon ===
Child		Lifetime	Spouse	Notes	Place of birth
Tricia Cox	Patricia Nixon; Nickname: Tricia	Born February 21, 1946 (age 80)	Edward Ridley Finch Cox	Mother of Christopher Nixon Cox (born 1979)	Whittier, California
Julie Eisenhower	Julie Nixon	Born July 5, 1948 (age 78)	Dwight David Eisenhower II son of John Eisenhower and grandson of President Dwight Eisenhower	Mother of: Jennie Elizabeth Eisenhower (born 1978); Alexander Richard Eisenhower (born 1980); Melanie Catherine Eisenhower (born 1984)	Washington, D.C.

=== Gerald and Betty Ford ===
Child		Lifetime	Spouse	Notes	Place of birth
Michael Ford	Michael Gerald Ford	Born March 14, 1950 (age 76)	Gayle Ann Brumbaugh	Father of: Sarah Joyce Ford (born 1979); Rebekah Elizabeth Ford (born 1982); Hannah Gayle Ford (born 1985)	East Grand Rapids, Michigan
Jack Ford	John Gardner Ford; Nickname: Jack	Born March 16, 1952 (age 74)	Juliann Felando	Father of: Christian Gerald Ford (born 1997); Jonathan August Ford (born 1999)	East Grand Rapids, Michigan
Steven Ford	Steven Meigs Ford	Born May 19, 1956 (age 70)	No spouse, no children		East Grand Rapids, Michigan
Susan Bales	Susan Elizabeth Ford	Born July 6, 1957 (age 69)	Charles Vance	Mother of: Tyne Mary Vance (born 1980); Heather Elizabeth Vance (born 1983)	Washington, D.C.
Susan Bales	Susan Elizabeth Ford	Born July 6, 1957 (age 69)	Vaden Bales	No children with Vaden Bales	Washington, D.C.

=== Jimmy and Rosalynn Carter ===
Child		Lifetime	Spouse	Notes	Place of birth
Jack Carter	John William Carter; Nickname: Jack	Born July 3, 1947 (age 79)	Juliet “Judy” Langford	Father of: Jason James Carter (born 1975); Sarah Rosemary Carter (born 1978)	Portsmouth, Virginia
Jack Carter	John William Carter; Nickname: Jack	Born July 3, 1947 (age 79)	Elizabeth Brasfield	Two stepchildren: John Chuldenko and Sarah Chuldenko Reynolds	Portsmouth, Virginia
James Earl Carter III	James Earl Carter III; Nickname: Chip, Jim III, and Jimmy Jr.	Born April 12, 1950 (age 76)	Caron Griffin	Father of: James Earl Carter IV (born 1977)	Honolulu, Hawaii
James Earl Carter III	James Earl Carter III; Nickname: Chip, Jim III, and Jimmy Jr.	Born April 12, 1950 (age 76)	Ginger Hodges	Father of: Margaret Alicia Carter (born 1987)	Honolulu, Hawaii
James Earl Carter III	James Earl Carter III; Nickname: Chip, Jim III, and Jimmy Jr.	Born April 12, 1950 (age 76)	Becky Payne	One stepson: Casey Payne Gallagher (born 1985)	Honolulu, Hawaii
	Donnel Jeffrey Carter; Nickname: Jeff	Born August 18, 1952 (age 74)	Annette Jene Davis (1952–2021)	Father of: Joshua Jeffrey Carter (born 1984); Jeremy Davis Carter (1987–2015); James Carlton Carter (born 1991)	New London, Connecticut
Amy Carter	Amy Lynn Carter	Born October 19, 1967 (age 59)	James Gregory Wentzel	Mother of Hugo James Wentzel (born 1999)	Plains, Georgia
Amy Carter	Amy Lynn Carter	Born October 19, 1967 (age 59)	John Joseph "Jay" Kelly	Mother of Errol Carter Kelly (born 2010)	Plains, Georgia

=== Ronald Reagan and Jane Wyman ===
Child		Lifetime	Spouse	Notes	Place of birth
Maureen Reagan	Maureen Elizabeth Reagan	January 4, 1941 – August 8, 2001 (aged 60)	John Filippone	No children	Los Angeles, California
Maureen Reagan	Maureen Elizabeth Reagan	January 4, 1941 – August 8, 2001 (aged 60)	David Sills	No children	Los Angeles, California
Maureen Reagan	Maureen Elizabeth Reagan	January 4, 1941 – August 8, 2001 (aged 60)	Dennis C. Revell	Mother of Margaret "Rita" Mirembe Revell (born 1985) (adopted)	Los Angeles, California
Michael Reagan	Michael Edward Reagan Nickname: Mike; most recently deceased First Child.	March 18, 1945 – January 4, 2026 (aged 80) (adopted by Reagan & Wyman shortly after his birth)	Pamela Gail Putnam	No children	Los Angeles, California
Michael Reagan	Michael Edward Reagan Nickname: Mike; most recently deceased First Child.	March 18, 1945 – January 4, 2026 (aged 80) (adopted by Reagan & Wyman shortly after his birth)	Colleen Sterns	Father of: Cameron Michael Reagan (born 1978); Ashley Marie Reagan (born 1983)	Los Angeles, California
	Christine Reagan	June 26, 1947 – June 27, 1947 (aged 1 day)	No spouse	Died shortly after birth.	

=== Ronald and Nancy Reagan ===
Child		Lifetime	Spouse	Place of birth
Patti Davis	Patricia Ann Davis; Nickname: Patti	Born October 21, 1952 (age 74)	Paul Grilley No children	Los Angeles, California
Ron Reagan	Ronald Prescott Reagan; Nickname: Ron	Born May 20, 1958 (age 68)	Doria Palmieri No children	Los Angeles, California
Ron Reagan	Ronald Prescott Reagan; Nickname: Ron	Born May 20, 1958 (age 68)	Federica Basagni No children	Los Angeles, California

=== George H. W. and Barbara Bush ===
Child		Lifetime	Spouse	Notes	Place of birth
George Bush	George Walker Bush; 43rd president (2001–2009)	Born July 6, 1946 (age 80)	Laura Lane Welch	46th governor of Texas (1995–2000) and 43rd president of the United States See below at George W. and Laura Bush	New Haven, Connecticut
Robin Bush	Pauline Robinson Bush; Nickname: Robin	December 20, 1949 – October 11, 1953 (aged 3)	No spouse	Died of leukemia.	Compton, California
John Bush	John Ellis Bush; Nickname: Jeb	Born February 11, 1953 (age 73)	Columba Garnica Gallo	43rd governor of Florida (1999–2007) Father of: George Prescott Bush (born 1976); Noelle Lucila Bush (born 1977); John Ellis "Jebby" Bush Jr. (born 1983)	Midland, Texas
Neil Bush	Neil Mallon Bush	Born January 22, 1955 (age 71)	Sharon Smith	Father of: Lauren Pierce Bush (born 1984); Pierce Mallon Bush (born 1986); Ashley Walker Bush (born 1989)	Midland, Texas
Neil Bush	Neil Mallon Bush	Born January 22, 1955 (age 71)	Maria Manass Andrews	Three stepchildren from Maria A. Bush's first marriage: Elizabeth Dwen "Lizzie" Andrews (born 1991); Robert "Pace" Andrews II (born 1994); Thomas Alexander "Alex" Andrews (born 2001)	Midland, Texas
Marvin Bush	Marvin Pierce Bush	Born October 22, 1956 (age 70)	Margaret Conway Molster	Father of: Marshall Lloyd Bush (born 1986) (adopted); Charles Walker Bush (born 1989) (adopted)	Midland, Texas
Dorothy Koch	Dorothy Walker Bush; Nickname: Doro	Born August 18, 1959 (age 67)	William LeBlond	Mother of: Samuel Bush "Sam" LeBlond (born 1984); Nancy Ellis "Ellie" LeBlond (born 1986)	Harris County, Texas
Dorothy Koch	Dorothy Walker Bush; Nickname: Doro	Born August 18, 1959 (age 67)	Robert P. Koch	Mother of: Robert David Koch (born 1993); Georgia Grace "Gigi" Koch (born 1996)	Harris County, Texas

=== Bill and Hillary Clinton ===
Child		Lifetime	Spouse	Notes	Place of birth
Chelsea Clinton	Chelsea Victoria Clinton	Born February 27, 1980 (age 46)	Marc Mezvinsky	Mother of: Charlotte Clinton Mezvinsky (born 2014); Aidan Clinton Mezvinsky (born 2016); Jasper Clinton Mezvinsky (born 2019)	Little Rock, Arkansas

== 21st century ==
=== George W. and Laura Bush ===
Child		Lifetime	Spouse	Notes	Place of birth
Barbara Bush	Barbara Pierce Bush	Born November 25, 1981 (age 44)	Craig Louis Coyne	Only known twin first children along with her younger twin sister, Jenna. Mother of: Cora Georgia Coyne (born 2021); Edward Finn Coyne (born 2024)	Dallas, Texas
Jenna Hager	Jenna Welch Bush	Born November 25, 1981 (age 44)	Henry Chase Hager	Only known twin first children along with her older twin sister, Barbara. Mother of: Margaret Laura "Mila" Hager (born 2013); Poppy Louise Hager (born 2015); Henry "Hal" Harold Hager (born 2019)	Dallas, Texas

=== Barack and Michelle Obama ===
Child		Lifetime	Spouse	Notes	Place of birth
Malia Obama	Malia Ann Obama	Born July 4, 1998 (age 28)	Unmarried		Chicago, Illinois
Sasha Obama	Natasha Marian Obama; Nickname: Sasha	Born June 10, 2001 (age 25)	Unmarried		Chicago, Illinois

=== Donald and Ivana Trump ===
Child		Lifetime	Spouse	Notes	Place of birth
Donald Trump Jr.	Donald John Trump Jr. Nickname: Don Jr.	Born December 31, 1977 (age 48)	Vanessa Kay Haydon; Divorced	Trustee of The Trump Organization along with Eric. Father of: Kai Madison Trump (born 2007); Donald John Trump III (born 2009); Tristan Milos Trump (born 2011); Spencer Frederick Trump (born 2012); Chloe Sophia Trump (born 2014)	Manhattan, New York
Donald Trump Jr.	Donald John Trump Jr. Nickname: Don Jr.	Born December 31, 1977 (age 48)	Bettina Anderson		Manhattan, New York
Ivanka Trump	Ivana Marie Trump; Nickname: Ivanka	Born October 30, 1981 (age 45)	Jared Corey Kushner	Senior Advisor to the President (2017–2021) Mother of: Arabella Rose Kushner (born 2011); Joseph Frederick Kushner (born 2013); Theodore James Kushner (born 2016)	Manhattan, New York
Eric Trump	Eric Frederick Trump	Born January 6, 1984 (age 42)	Lara Lea Yunaska	Trustee of the Trump Organization along with Don Jr. Father of: Eric Luke Trump (born 2017); Carolina Dorothy Trump (born 2019)	Manhattan, New York

=== Donald Trump and Marla Maples ===
Child		Lifetime	Spouse	Notes	Place of birth
Tiffany Trump	Tiffany Ariana Trump	Born October 13, 1993 (age 33)	Michael Boulos	Mother of: Alexander Trump Boulos (born 2025)	West Palm Beach, Florida

=== Donald and Melania Trump ===
Child		Lifetime	Spouse	Notes	Place of birth
Barron Trump	Barron William Trump	Born March 20, 2006 (age 20)	Unmarried	Youngest living child of any president	Manhattan, New York

=== Joe and Neilia Hunter Biden ===
Child		Lifetime	Spouse	Notes	Place of birth
Beau Biden	Joseph Robinette Biden III; Nickname: Beau	February 3, 1969 – May 30, 2015 (aged 46)	Hallie Olivere	Attorney General of Delaware (2007–2015). Died of glioblastoma. Father of: Natalie Naomi Biden (born 2004); Robert Hunter Biden II (born 2006)	Wilmington, Delaware
Hunter Biden	Robert Hunter Biden; Nickname: Hunter	Born February 4, 1970 (age 56)	Kathleen Buhle; Divorced	Father of: Naomi King Biden (born 1993); Finnegan James Biden (born 2000); Roberta Mabel "Maisy" Biden (born 2001)	Wilmington, Delaware
Hunter Biden	Robert Hunter Biden; Nickname: Hunter	Born February 4, 1970 (age 56)	Lunden Roberts	Father of: Navy Joan Roberts (born 2018)	Wilmington, Delaware
Hunter Biden	Robert Hunter Biden; Nickname: Hunter	Born February 4, 1970 (age 56)	Melissa Cohen	Father of: Beau Biden Jr. (born 2020)	Wilmington, Delaware
	Naomi Christina Biden; Nickname: Amy	November 8, 1971 – December 18, 1972 (aged 1)	No spouse	Died in a car accident with her mother.	Wilmington, Delaware

=== Joe and Jill Biden ===
Child		Lifetime	Spouse	Notes	Place of birth
Ashley Biden	Ashley Blazer Biden	Born June 8, 1981 (age 45)	Howard David Krein (Divorced in 2025)	No children	Wilmington, Delaware

== Living presidential children ==
As of November 2026, 32 presidential children are living. In order of their ages, they are: Current first child

Name	Birth	President
Lynda Bird Johnson Robb	March 19, 1944 (age 82)	Lyndon B. Johnson
Tricia Nixon Cox	February 21, 1946 (age 80)	Richard Nixon
George W. Bush	July 6, 1946 (age 80)	George H. W. Bush
Luci Baines Johnson	July 2, 1947 (age 79)	Lyndon B. Johnson
Jack Carter	July 3, 1947 (age 79)	Jimmy Carter
Julie Nixon Eisenhower	July 5, 1948 (age 78)	Richard Nixon
Michael Gerald Ford	March 14, 1950 (age 76)	Gerald Ford
James Earl Carter III	April 12, 1950 (age 76)	Jimmy Carter
John Gardner Ford	March 16, 1952 (age 74)	Gerald Ford
Jeff Carter	August 18, 1952 (age 74)	Jimmy Carter
Patti Davis	October 21, 1952 (age 74)	Ronald Reagan
Jeb Bush	February 11, 1953 (age 73)	George H. W. Bush
Neil Bush	January 22, 1955 (age 71)	George H. W. Bush
Steven Ford	May 19, 1956 (age 70)	Gerald Ford
Marvin Bush	October 22, 1956 (age 70)	George H. W. Bush
Susan Ford Bales	July 6, 1957 (age 69)	Gerald Ford
Caroline Kennedy	November 27, 1957 (age 68)	John F. Kennedy
Ron Reagan	May 20, 1958 (age 68)	Ronald Reagan
Dorothy Bush Koch	August 18, 1959 (age 67)	George H. W. Bush
Amy Carter	October 19, 1967 (age 59)	Jimmy Carter
Hunter Biden	February 4, 1970 (age 56)	Joe Biden
Donald Trump Jr.	December 31, 1977 (age 48)	Donald Trump
Chelsea Clinton	February 27, 1980 (age 46)	Bill Clinton
Ashley Biden	June 8, 1981 (age 45)	Joe Biden
Ivanka Trump	October 30, 1981 (age 45)	Donald Trump
Barbara Pierce Bush	November 25, 1981 (age 44)	George W. Bush
Jenna Bush Hager	November 25, 1981 (age 44)	George W. Bush
Eric Trump	January 6, 1984 (age 42)	Donald Trump
Tiffany Trump	October 13, 1993 (age 33)	Donald Trump
Malia Obama	July 4, 1998 (age 28)	Barack Obama
Sasha Obama	June 10, 2001 (age 25)	Barack Obama
Barron Trump	March 20, 2006 (age 20)	Donald Trump

The most recent presidential child to die was Michael Reagan, the son of Ronald Reagan, who died on January 4, 2026, at the age of 80.

== See also ==
- Society of Presidential Descendants
