= Boettiger =

Boettiger is a surname. Notable people with the surname include:

- Clarence John Boettiger (1900–1950), American newspaperman and military officer
- John Roosevelt Boettiger (born 1939), American developmental and clinical psychologist
- Pepo (cartoonist) (1911–2000), Chilean cartoonist, real name Rene Ríos Boettiger
