= Curtis Roosevelt =

American writer (1930–2016)

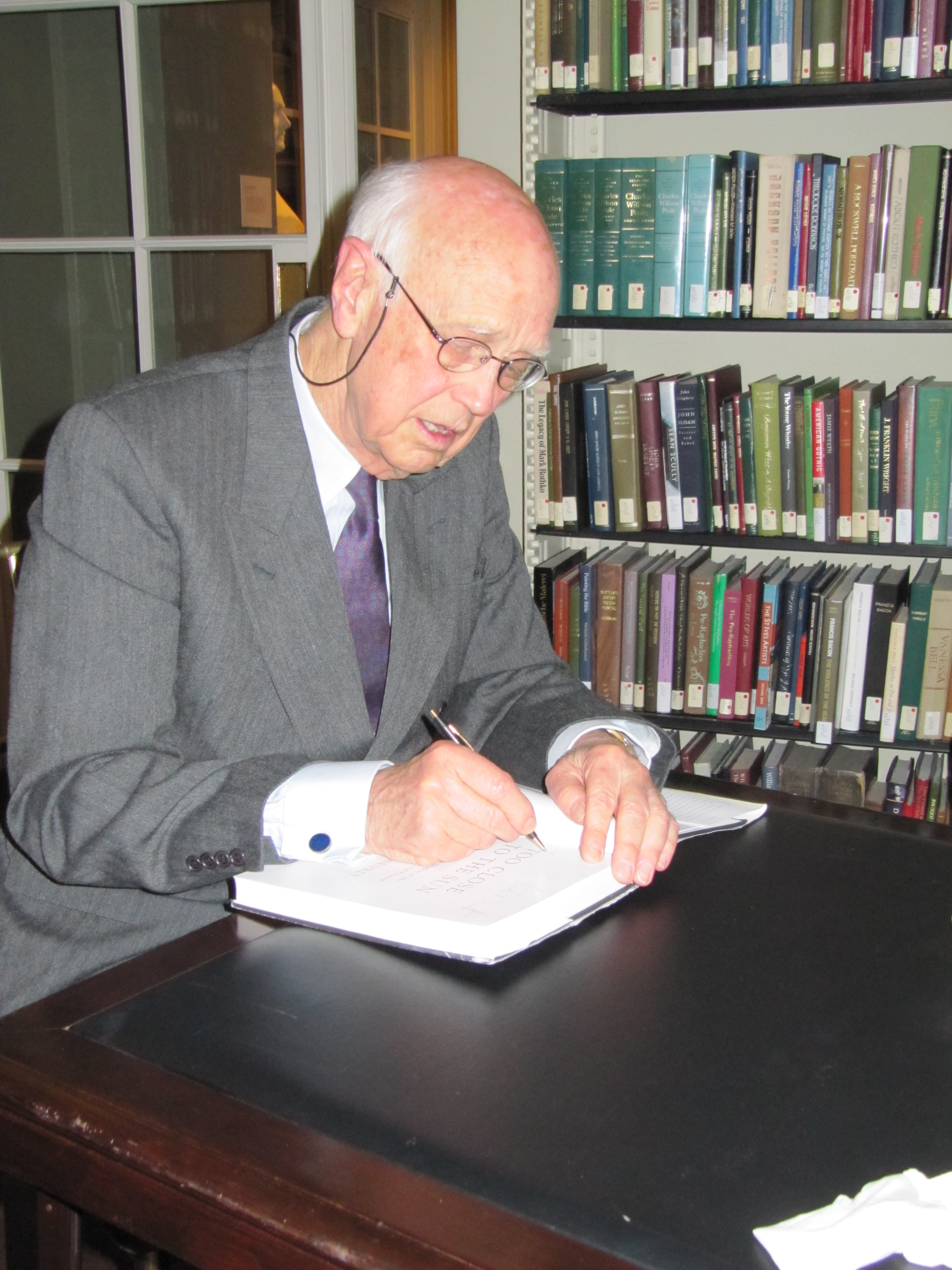
- Roosevelt during a 2010 visit to the Boston Athenæum
- Born: Curtis Roosevelt Dall; April 19, 1930; New York City, U.S.
- Died: September 26, 2016 (aged 86); Saint-Bonnet-du-Gard, France
- Education: Columbia University; Northwestern Military and Naval Academy; Loyola University in Los Angeles
- Occupation: Writer
- Children: One
- Parents: Anna Roosevelt Halsted; Curtis Bean Dall
- Family: See Roosevelt family
- Military career
- Branch: United States Army
- Rank: Private

Curtis Roosevelt (né Dall; April 19, 1930 – September 26, 2016) was an American writer. Roosevelt was the son of Anna Roosevelt and her first husband, Curtis Bean Dall. He was the eldest grandson of President Franklin D. Roosevelt and First Lady Eleanor Roosevelt.

== Personal life ==
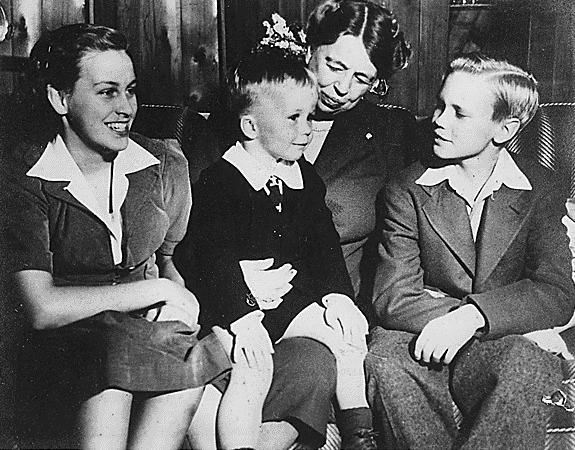
Eleanor Roosevelt with her grandchildren; Anna Eleanor Dall, John Roosevelt Boettiger, and Curtis Roosevelt, 1943

Curtis Roosevelt Dall was born on April 19, 1930, in New York City. When he was three, Curtis, his sister Eleanor (born 1927), and his mother moved into the White House, where they lived until his mother remarried in 1935. Newspaper articles frequently referred to the children by their nicknames, "Buzzie" and "Sistie." After his parents' 1934 divorce, his mother married journalist Clarence John Boettiger in 1935. His younger half-brother, John, was born in 1939. When his mother and Boettiger divorced in 1949, Eleanor Roosevelt and Anna did not want Curtis to reassume the surname Dall, so Mrs. Roosevelt suggested he use his middle name as his last name.

Roosevelt graduated from Northwestern Military and Naval Academy in Lake Geneva, Wisconsin. He later attended Loyola University in Los Angeles.

Roosevelt married four times, first on May 23, 1950, to Robin H. Edwards, with whom he had one daughter, Julianna Edwards Roosevelt. Roosevelt and his wife Robin divorced in March 1954. He subsequently married Ruth W. Sublette on March 6, 1955, and Jeanette Schlottman on May 2, 1961. In 1985, he married Marina Ayers Jones. He had one grandson, Julianna's son Nicholas Roosevelt.

== Career ==
In the mid-1950s, Roosevelt served as a private in the United States Army.

Between 1956 and 1964, Roosevelt worked for several years in advertising and then primarily for nonprofit institutions, including as regional director for the National Citizens Council for Better Schools and then as vice president in charge of public affairs for the New School for Social Research. From 1963 to 1964, he served as executive director of the United States Committee for the United Nations.

In 1964, Roosevelt was recruited by the Secretariat of the United Nations to join the Public Information Department and in the following years, until 1983, held various positions in the international civil service. Roosevelt obtained his master's degree from the School of Government and Public Law at Columbia University.

From 1983 to 1986, Roosevelt served as principal at the Dartington College of Arts in Devon, England. He served as a visiting professor at the Geneva School of Diplomacy and International Relations, receiving an honorary doctorate in 2010. In 1987, he and his wife Marina moved to Deia, Mallorca, where Roosevelt devoted himself to pottery, some of his work being exhibited in a Palma gallery. He also occasionally wrote on American politics for El Mundo in Spain.

Roosevelt's book Too Close to the Sun: Growing up in the Shadow of my Grandparents Franklin and Eleanor was published in 2008 and led to a series of radio and television appearances by the author. In 2012, the book was translated and published in France.

The Roosevelts lived in a small village in the south of France, where Marina served on the municipal council. He lectured at Lille University and regularly appeared on French television. He also wrote occasionally for Le Figaro, the International Herald Tribune and had articles in La Tribune, France-Amerique, Marianne and the Commune de la Commune. Because of his connection to his famous family, Roosevelt was often consulted by the Roosevelt Library in Hyde Park, New York and the National Park Service for comments on library exhibits and historic homes Springwood and Val-Kill.

In 2013, Roosevelt published an essay in e-book form, "Eyewitness in Israel: 1948", detailing his journey, at age 18, to the then-new nation at the behest of his grandmother Eleanor, with whom he was traveling in Paris and who sent him in her stead to report back. Early in 2016 he published his last book, a collection of essays about the Roosevelt family in which he had grown, Upstairs at the Roosevelts': Growing Up with Franklin and Eleanor.

Roosevelt died on September 26, 2016, due to a heart attack, in Saint-Bonnet-du-Gard at the age of 86.

== Bibliography ==
Written by Curtis Roosevelt:

- Too Close to the Sun: Growing Up in the Shadow of my Grandparents, Franklin and Eleanor. Public Affairs. New York, 2008.
- "Eyewitness in Israel: 1948". self-published e-book, 2013.
- Upstairs at the Roosevelts. Potomac Books, 2017.
