= Leigh McCullough =

American psychotherapist (1945–2012)

Leigh McCullough (June 5, 1945 – June 7, 2012) was an American psychotherapist, researcher, educator, and the pioneer of short-term dynamic psychotherapy (STDP). Her treatment model focused on the learned fears of experiencing certain emotions, or what she called affect phobias.

== Early and personal life ==
McCullough was born Mary Lee Colson on June 5, 1945, in Kingsville, Texas. She was the daughter of James Melbourne Colson Jr. (1919–2005) and his wife, Lena White Miller Colson (1921–2012). She had two siblings, James Melbourne Colson III and Douglas Steven Colson.

On August 29, 1964, in Pass Christian, Mississippi, she married Robert Milton Hudspeth. She married George Vaillant on December 4, 1993, in Washington, Connecticut. It was her third marriage. Her fourth marriage in 2005 was to John Roosevelt Boettiger, grandson of President Franklin D. Roosevelt. She had a daughter, Kelly McCullough, with her first husband, and a son, Scott Hudspeth, with her second. She also had four step-children through her fourth marriage: Adam, Sara, Joshua and Paul Boettiger.

== About ==
Affect phobias is an exceptionally clear and useful reformulation of psychodynamic conflicts in behavioral terms. For example, in case of a psychodynamic conflict between anger (or sexual desire, or grief, or closeness) and anxiety (or guilt, or shame); McCullough framed anger as an (internal) object that has learned (phobically) to activate anxiety. Thus in McCullough's reformulation, anger and anxiety do not stand against each other, as in an interpersonal conflict, but rather: anger activates anxiety, which then activates some defence mechanisms to avoid or inhibit the activation of anger. In terms of Freud's Id, ego and super-ego, the Id (anger) activates the super-ego (anxiety), which then activates the ego defences against the id.

McCullough's reformulation of psychodynamic conflicts in terms of phobia both clarifies the therapeutic focus and suggests the intrapsychical change mechanism. Treatment of affect phobias progresses similarly to the exposure technique of behavioral therapies, with the difference that affects could be viewed as an internal phobia instead of external phobias such as fear of spiders or heights. Thus therapy should expose the patient to the activation of their anger (or sexual desire, or grief, or closeness), and the change mechanism is desensitization (or habituation) of anger activation.

=== Teaching ===
McCullough was an associate clinical professor at Harvard Medical School, director of the Psychotherapy Research Program at Harvard's Beth Israel Deaconess Medical Center, and a visiting professor at the Norwegian University of Science and Technology (Trondheim, Norway). She was the 1996 Voorhees Distinguished Professor at the Menninger Clinic and received the 1996 Michael Franz Basch Award from the Silvan Tomkins Institute for her contributions to the exploration of affect in psychotherapy. Dr. McCullough was on the editorial board of the journal Psychotherapy Research and of the Journal of Brief Therapy, and conducted training seminars in the Affect Phobia model worldwide.

=== Death and legacy ===
Leigh McCullough was diagnosed with ALS in 2010 and died on June 7, 2012, in Boston, Massachusetts. At the time of her death she had been married to John Roosevelt Boettiger; she had formerly been married to George Vaillant.

== See also ==
- David Malan
- Intensive short-term dynamic psychotherapy.
- Silvan Tomkins

== Bibliography ==
- McCullough Vaillant, Leigh (1997). Changing Character: Short-term Anxiety-regulating Psychotherapy For Restructuring Defenses, Affects, And Attachment. Basic Books. ISBN 978-0465077922.
- McCullough, Leigh; Kuhn, Nat; Andrews, Stuart; Kaplan, Amelia; Wolf, Jonathan; Lanza Hurley, Cara (2003). Treating Affect Phobia: A Manual for Short-Term Dynamic Psychotherapy. The Guilford Press. ISBN 978-1572308107.
