= Clarence John Boettiger =

American journalist (1900–1950)

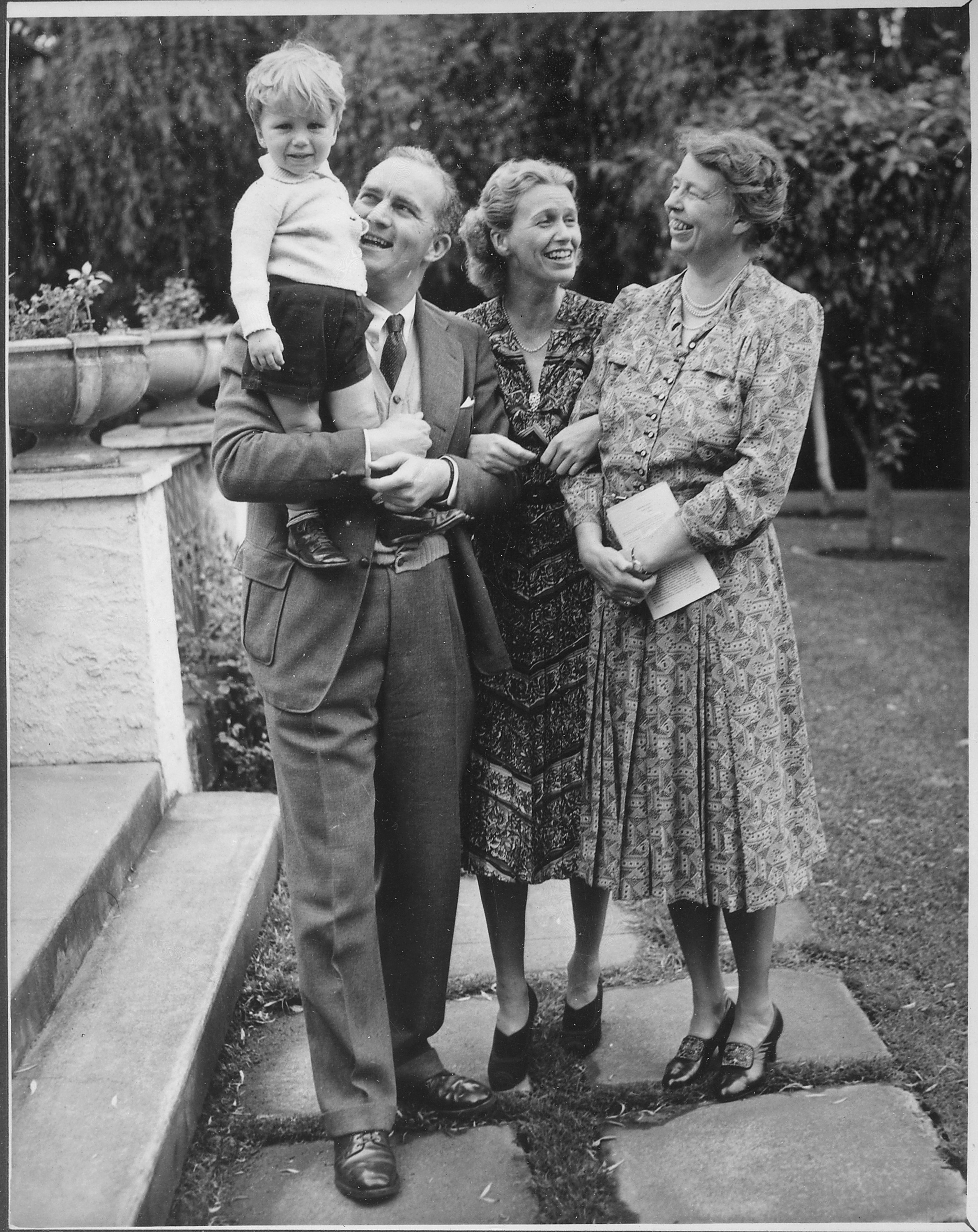
- Boettiger and his wife Anna (center) with their son John and Eleanor Roosevelt (1942)
- Born: March 25, 1900; Chicago, Illinois, U.S.
- Died: October 31, 1950 (aged 50); New York City, U.S.
- Occupation: Journalist
- Spouses: Anna Roosevelt (m. 1935; div. 1949) Virginia Daly Lunn (m. 1949)
- Children: John Roosevelt Boettiger
- Military career
- Allegiance: United States
- Branch: United States Army
- Service years: 1942–1944
- Rank: Lieutenant Colonel
- Conflicts: World War II: Operation Avalanche; Operation Husky
- Awards: Legion of Merit

Clarence John Boettiger (March 25, 1900 – October 31, 1950) was an American journalist and military officer. He was the second husband of Anna Roosevelt, the daughter and first child of President Franklin D. Roosevelt and First Lady Eleanor Roosevelt.

== Early life ==
Clarence John Boettiger was born in Chicago on March 25, 1900, to Adam C. Boettiger, a banker, and Dora Ott. In his high school years, he started going by his middle name. He began his career in journalism as a police reporter for the City News Bureau. He joined the Chicago Tribune in 1923 and was assigned to Washington, D.C., to cover President Franklin D. Roosevelt when he first campaigned for the presidency in 1932. The Tribune was fiercely anti-Roosevelt.

Boettiger met FDR's daughter, Anna Roosevelt Dall, on her father's campaign train. She was recently separated from her husband Curtis Bean Dall, and was living in the White House with her two children Eleanor and Curtis.

On January 18, 1935, Boettiger and Roosevelt Dall were married in the Roosevelts' New York townhouse at 49 E. 65th Street. The wedding was low-key and the couple said they would live quietly. At that time Boettiger had resigned from the Tribune and taken a job with the Motion Picture Producers and Distributors of America.

== Career with the Hearst Newspapers ==
Before William Randolph Hearst, the newspaper magnate, fell out with President Roosevelt, he provided prominent and lucrative employment for FDR's son Elliott Roosevelt and in November 1936, for Boettiger and Anna. Boettiger became publisher of the Seattle Post-Intelligencer, and Anna was editor of the paper's women's pages. Hearst agreed to give the Boettigers editorial freedom to "make it the best paper in Seattle."

With interruptions, the Boettigers lived in Seattle until after the war. Anna and Boettiger had one son, John Roosevelt Boettiger, born March 30, 1939. The president and his wife, Eleanor Roosevelt, occasionally visited them there. In 1940, Boettiger publicly argued for a third FDR term, unlike some of the Roosevelt sons.

== Military service ==
In 1942, Boettiger became concerned that he was not doing his part for the war effort. On inquiry, FDR declined to use him in diplomatic matters since he was in private business. In April 1942, Boettiger was given a leave of absence by Hearst and appointed a captain in the Army. He participated in the invasions of Sicily and Italy, served in the military government, and was promoted to major in November 1943 and to lieutenant colonel shortly thereafter. As a liaison officer in the military government, he was ashore at Salerno during the first day of the landings.

In January 1943, Boettiger was, along with brother-in-law Elliott, dispatched by President Roosevelt to attend the Teheran Conference. He composed the Declaration of the Three Powers from previous drafts. He also participated in other high-level meetings, including one in which he flew the Turkish President to Cairo for consultations. He and his wife Anna Roosevelt drafted FDR's "D Day Prayer" in 1944.

On January 29, 1944, Boettiger received the Legion of Merit for meritorious service in the Allied Military Government. His stepson Curtis Roosevelt suggested in his memoirs that Boettiger was initially unhappy in his military service, was not given worthwhile tasks in North Africa before the invasion of Sicily, and thought the Army was trying to keep him out of trouble due to his family. Boettiger requested a transfer stateside in 1944, where he resumed his civilian position.

== Post-war career ==
After the death of President Roosevelt in April 1945, Boettiger was no longer so appreciated as publisher of the Seattle Post-Intelligencer. Citing "irreconcilable differences," he resigned in June 1945. During the last war year, his wife had become essential to running the White House administratively for the ailing president. The couple looked for new challenges in the newspaper industry.

With the financial assistance of powerful Democratic backers, led by department store magnate Walter Kirschner, Boettiger purchased a small advertiser, the Phoenix Shopping News, in February 1946. He and Anna developed it into a daily newspaper, the Arizona Times in May 1947, intending to create a leading left-wing newspaper.

The project turned into a financial debacle that left the Boettigers bankrupt and their creditors angry and unpaid. By February 1948, Anna Boettiger took over the paper. In July 1948 the paper, which then had a payroll of 60, was sold to other investors; it failed the following year.

The Arizona Times project and failure put a strain on the family and the marriage. Boettiger and Anna divorced in August 1949, having cited mental cruelty and repeated humiliations. Boettiger went overseas while Anna took on new projects with her mother, including a joint radio program.

On November 1, 1949, Boettiger married Virginia Daly Lunn in The Hague. From July of that year, he was employed with Theodor Swanson Associates, public relations consultants, "in an advisory capacity for the Dutch government on the Indonesian question," as there was a popular movement for independence among the Indonesian people. He was not happy in that position, since he was essentially a reporter, not a publicist.

One year later, on Halloween 1950, Boettiger committed suicide by jumping from his seventh-floor room in the Weylin Hotel in New York City. He had been suffering from depression. Elliott Roosevelt was asked to identify the corpse, which was cremated without ceremonies.

His brother Wilfred explained that John Boettiger "threw everything he had into the paper [Arizona Times] and never was able to recover anything.....he had tried many times to free his mind from this defeat but nothing seemed to do any good."

== Legacy ==
Boettiger's correspondence is preserved in part at the Franklin D. Roosevelt Presidential Library and Museum, Hyde Park, N.Y. It cast some light on family relations and the contentious relationship with W.R. Hearst. The Arizona Times episode also demonstrates the importance of large donors to the Roosevelt family. Colonel Boettiger's diary notes from the Teheran summit, preserved at the FDR Library, have been quoted by historians seeking corroboration of Elliott Roosevelt's published account therefrom.

Biographers agree that John Boettiger had a fragile ego and had difficulty dealing with the strong-willed Anna and her illustrious family. He was an able reporter and newspaperman who provided an unusual link between the New Deal president and the Hearst empire.

Boettiger was the author of Jake Lingle: or Chicago on the Spot (1931). Lingle was a Chicago Tribune reporter assassinated by the Mob the previous year.
