= Saint-Bonnet-du-Gard =

- Commune
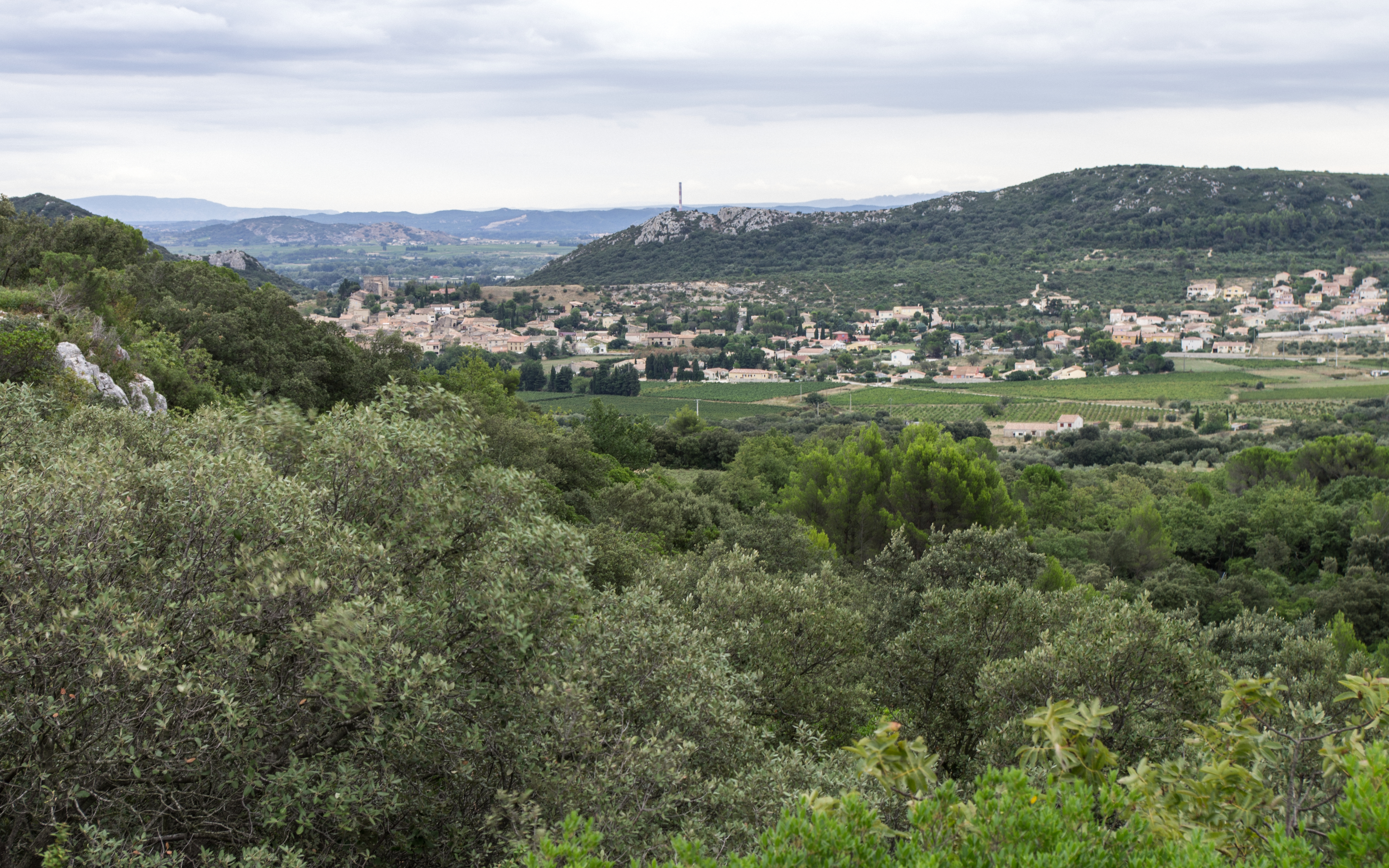
- A general view of Saint-Bonnet-du-Gard

- Coat of arms
- Location of Saint-Bonnet-du-Gard
- Location within France Location within Occitanie
- Coordinates: 43°55′40″N 4°32′46″E
- Country: France
- Region: Occitania
- Department: Gard
- Arrondissement: Nîmes
- Canton: Redessan
- Intercommunality: Pont du Gard

Government
  - Mayor (2020–2026): Jean-Marie Moulin
- Area^{1}: 6.84 km^{2} (2.64 sq mi)
- Elevation: 30 m (98 ft)
- Highest elevation: 170 m (560 ft)
- Lowest elevation: 26 m (85 ft)
- Population (2023): 798
  - Density: 117/km^{2} (302/sq mi)
- Time zone: UTC+01:00 (CET)
  - Summer (DST): UTC+02:00 (CEST)
- INSEE/Postal code: 30235 /30210
- ^{1} French Land Register data, which excludes lakes, ponds, glaciers > 1 km^{2} (0.386 sq mi or 247 acres) and river estuaries.

Saint-Bonnet-du-Gard (French pronunciation: [sɛ̃ bɔnɛ dy ɡaʁ]; Provençal: Sent Bonet del Gard) is a commune in the Gard department in southern France.

== Population ==
Historical population
Year	Pop.	±% p.a.
1968	300	—
1975	316	+0.75%
1982	358	+1.80%
1990	372	+0.48%
1999	579	+5.04%
2007	682	+2.07%
2012	811	+3.53%
2017	835	+0.58%
2023	798	−0.75%
Source: INSEE

== Gallery ==
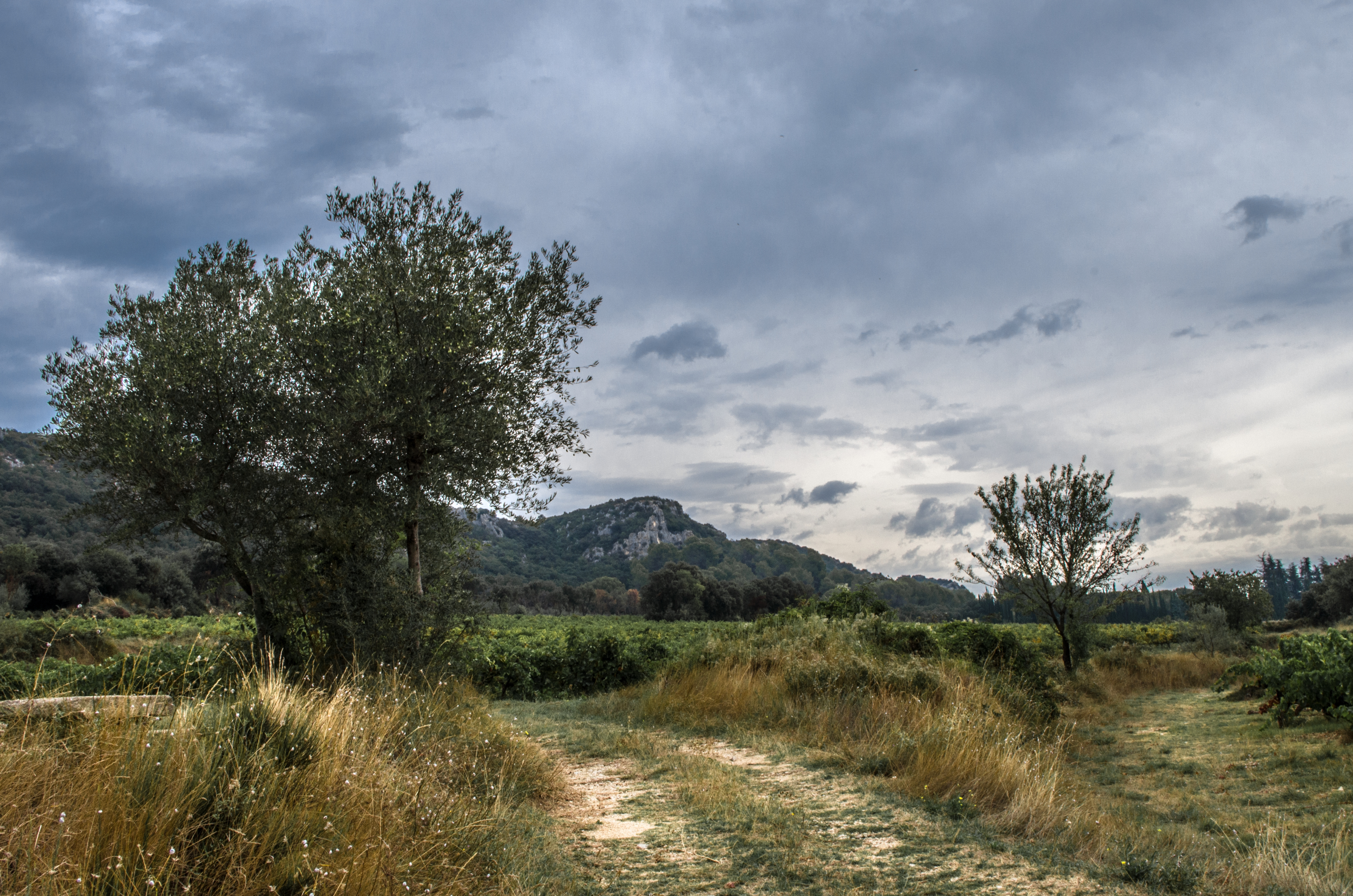

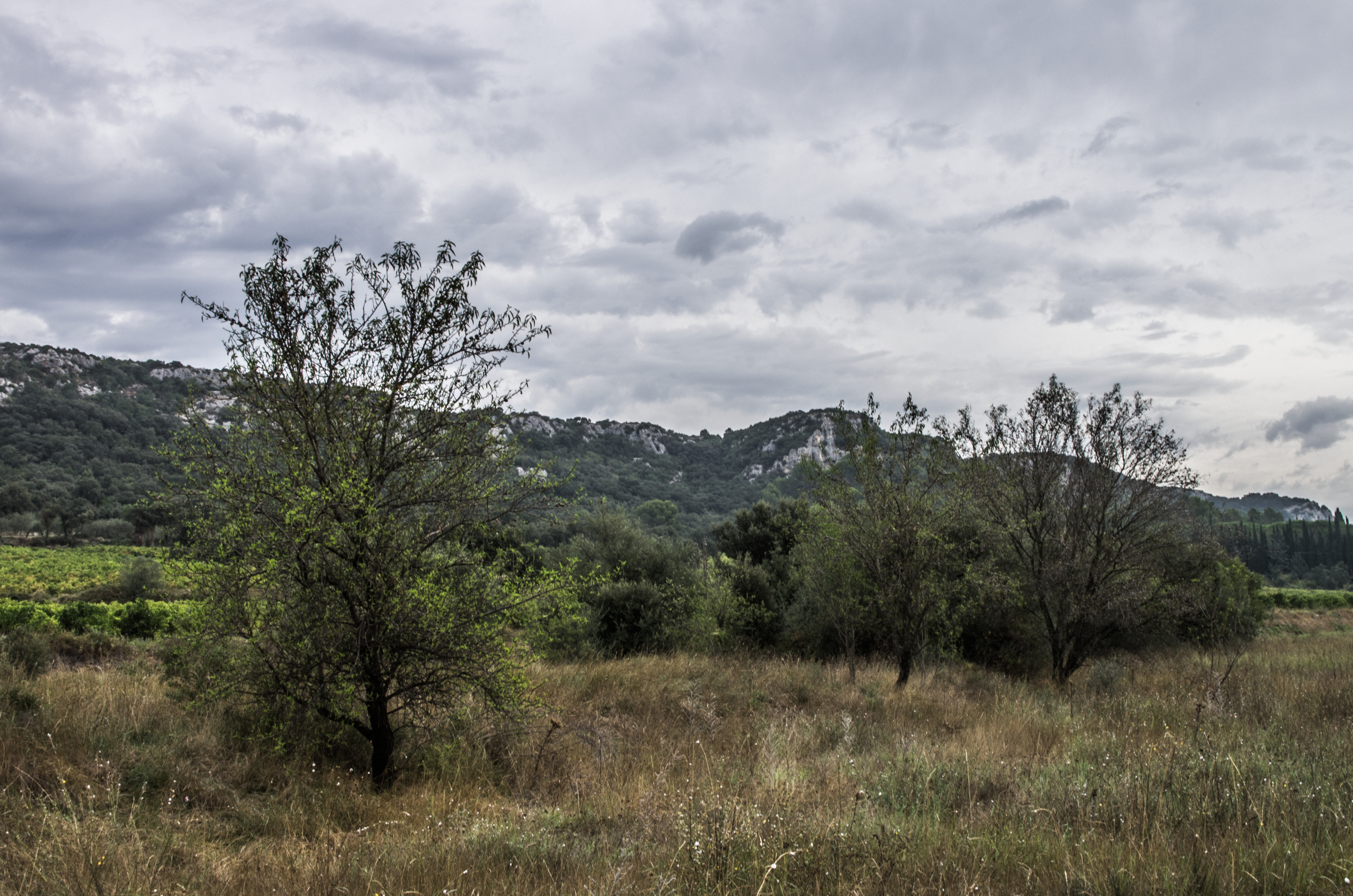

== See also ==
- Communes of the Gard department
