= Eleanor Roosevelt Seagraves =

American librarian and historian (born 1927)

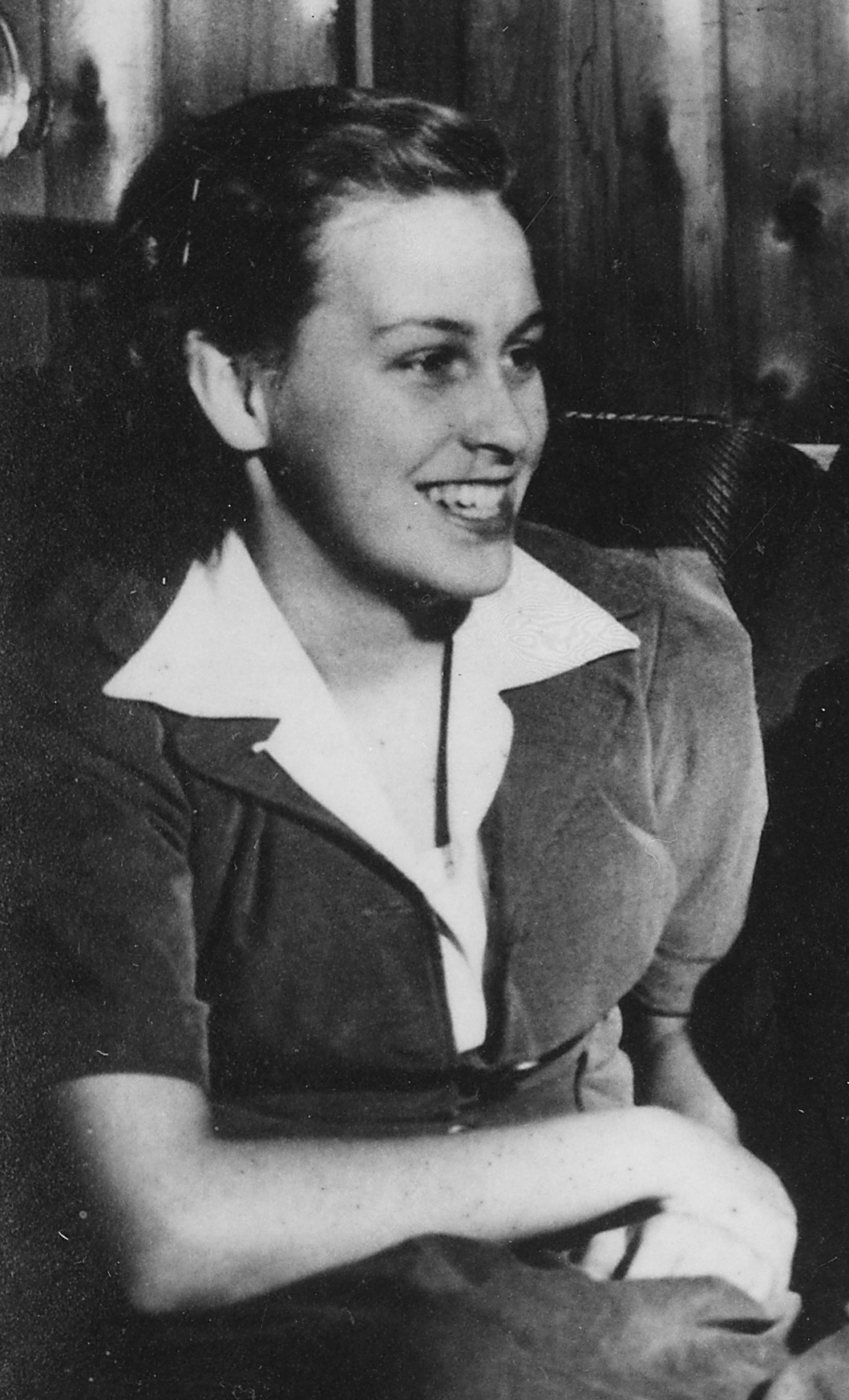
- "Sistie" Dall in 1943
- Born: Anna Eleanor Dall; March 25, 1927 (age 99); New York City, U.S.
- Education: Reed College, SUNY Geneseo
- Occupations: Educator; librarian
- Spouse: Van H. Seagraves (m. 1948; died 2012)
- Children: 3
- Parents: Curtis Bean Dall; Anna Roosevelt
- Relatives: See Roosevelt family

Anna Eleanor Roosevelt Seagraves (née Dall; born March 25, 1927) is an American librarian, educator, historian, and editor. She is the eldest grandchild of Franklin D. Roosevelt and Eleanor Roosevelt. Her parents are Anna Roosevelt Dall and her first husband Curtis Bean Dall. She is usually known as "Sistie", "Ellie" or "Eleanor". She is currently the oldest living grandchild of a US President.

== Early life ==
Sistie, as she was affectionately called in the press during her grandparents' tenure in the White House, was named for her mother and for her maternal grandmother, Eleanor Roosevelt. When her parents separated in 1933 (they divorced in 1934), she, along with her mother and brother Curtis, moved into the White House with her grandparents. Her mother would later remarry two more times and a younger half-brother, John Roosevelt Boettiger would join the family in 1939.

== Career ==
Seagraves completed three years of college at Reed College before her marriage and later earned a master's degree in Library Science from the State University of New York at Geneseo in 1964.

Seagraves is one of the few living Roosevelt family members who witnessed events firsthand during the White House years. Seagraves also is one of the few surviving people who witnessed her grandmother Eleanor Roosevelt's diplomacy. Each year, when Seagraves' grandmother held a picnic at Val-Kill for delinquent boys, she assisted Mrs. Roosevelt with these events. She was close to Eleanor Roosevelt throughout her life.

Seagraves has enjoyed a career as an educator and librarian. She edited Delano's Voyages of Commerce and Discovery (Berkshire House Publishers, 1994), drawn from the journals of Amasa Delano, as well as The Val-Kill Cook Book (The Eleanor Roosevelt Center at Val-Kill, 1984). Seagraves concentrated her career on keeping alive many of the causes her grandmother began and supported. She is an active participant in Democratic Party events in her area, and endorsed Barack Obama for the 2008 Presidential campaign. At 99, Seagraves resides in Maryland.

== Marriage and children ==
On July 7, 1948, she married Van H. Seagraves. Together, they had three children:

- Nicholas Delano Seagraves (born August 7, 1949)
- David Delano Seagraves (born August 26, 1952)
- Anna Fierst (born Anna Eleanor Seagraves Jr.; August 16, 1955)
