= Anna Roosevelt Halsted =

American writer and socialite (1906–1975)

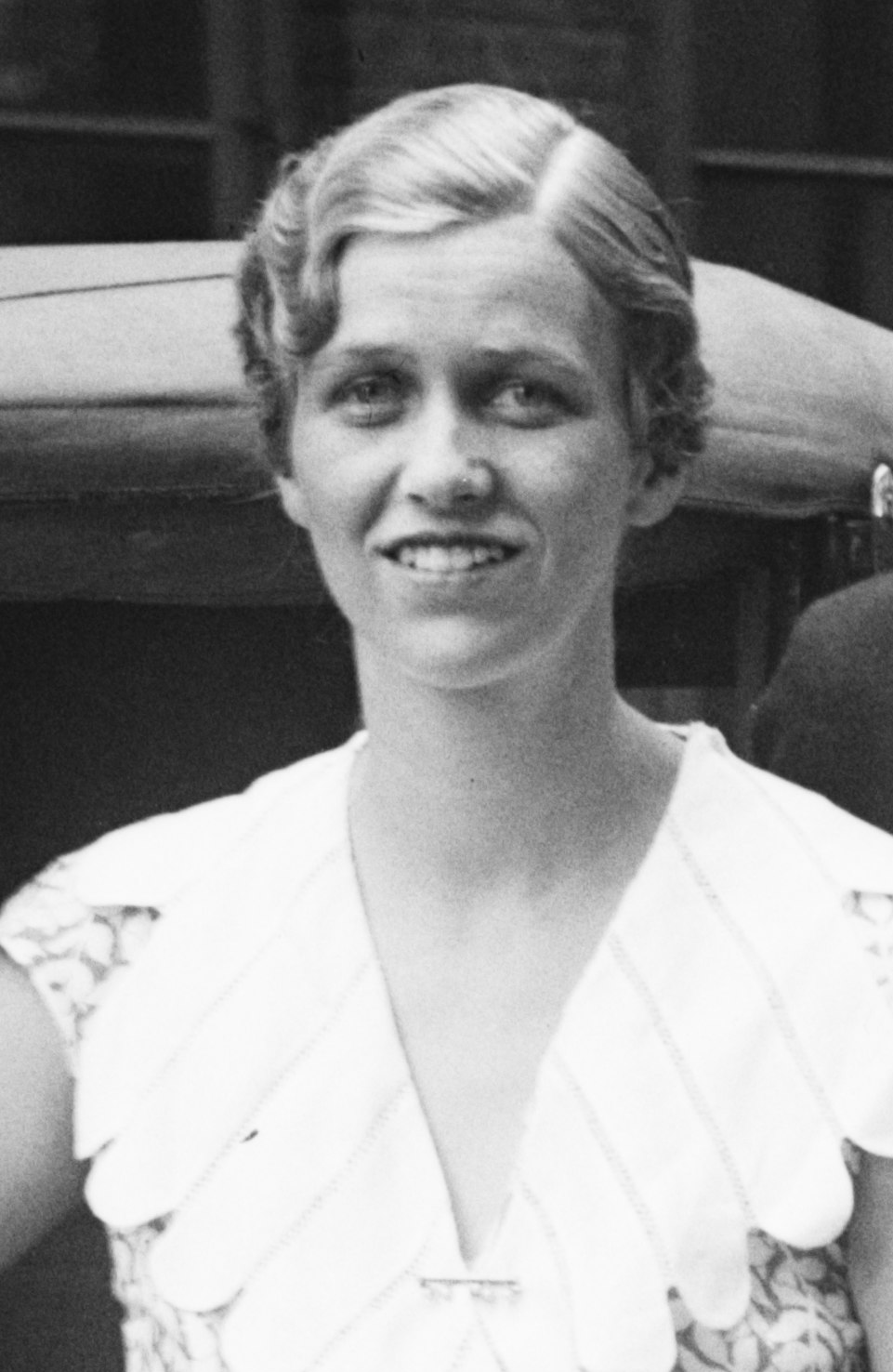
- Roosevelt in 1932
- Born: Anna Eleanor Roosevelt Jr. May 3, 1906; New York City, U.S.
- Died: December 1, 1975 (aged 69); New York City, U.S.
- Burial place: St. James Episcopal Churchyard, Hyde Park, New York, U.S.
- Occupations: Writer; editor; socialite
- Spouses: Curtis Bean Dall (m. 1926; div. 1934) Clarence John Boettiger (m. 1935; div. 1949) James Addison Halsted (m. 1952)
- Children: Eleanor; Curtis; John
- Parents: Franklin D. Roosevelt; Eleanor Roosevelt
- Relatives: Roosevelt family

Anna Eleanor Roosevelt Halsted (May 3, 1906 – December 1, 1975) was an American writer who worked as a newspaper editor and in public relations. Halsted also wrote two children's books published in the 1930s. She was the eldest child and only daughter of U.S. president Franklin D. Roosevelt and First Lady Eleanor Roosevelt. Halsted assisted her father as his advisor during World War II.

She worked with her second husband Clarence John Boettiger at the Seattle Post-Intelligencer, serving as editor of the women's pages for several years. Halsted later worked in public relations for universities. In 1963, John F. Kennedy appointed her to the Citizen's Advisory Council on the Status of Women. She also served for several years as vice-chairman of the President's Commission for the Observance of Human Rights.

== Biography ==
=== Early life and marriages ===
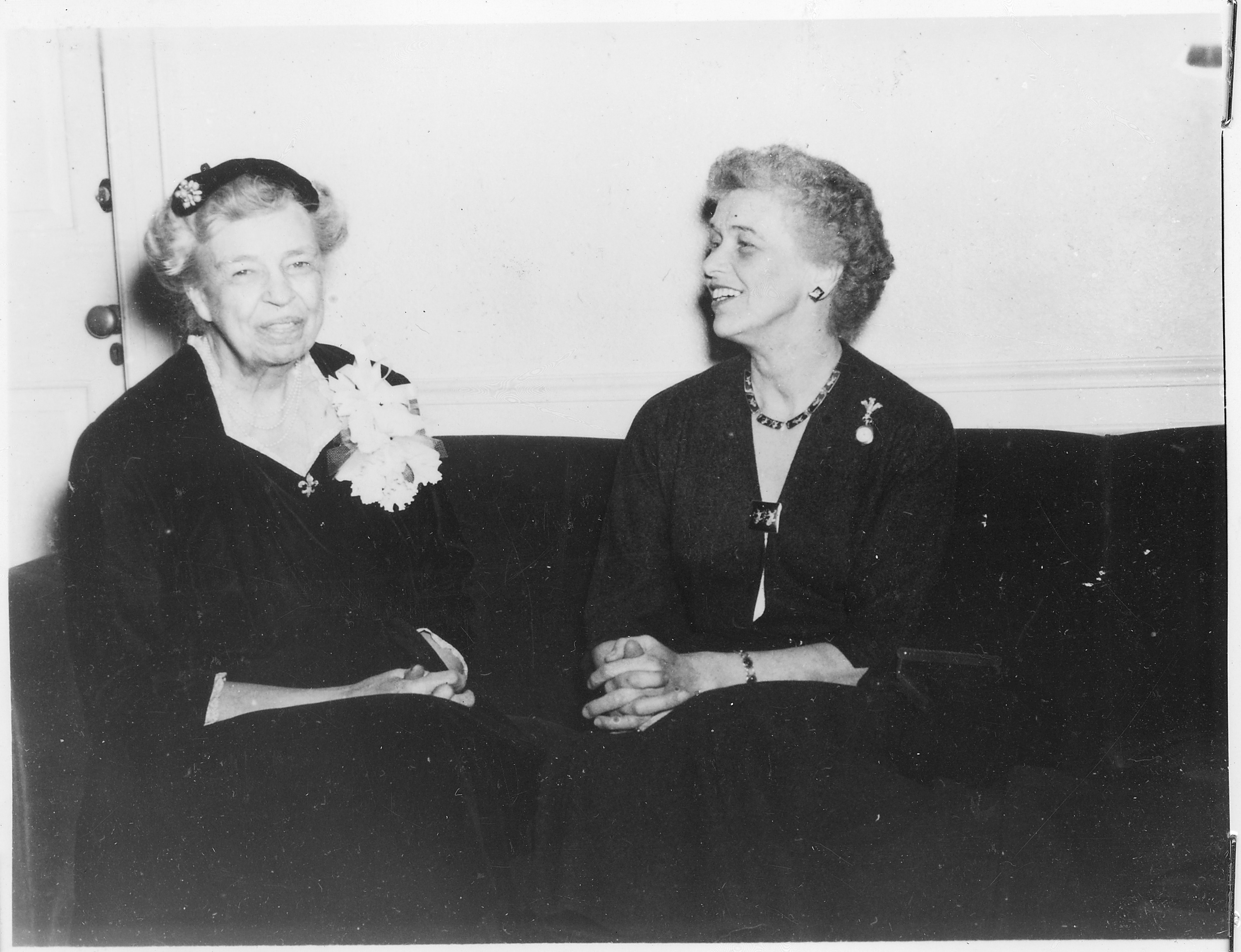
Anna Halsted (right) with Eleanor Roosevelt (left) at Syracuse University in 1956

Anna Eleanor Roosevelt Jr. was born at 125 East 36th Street in New York City. She was named for her mother, Anna Eleanor Roosevelt Sr., and maternal grandmother, Anna Rebecca Hall. She graduated from Miss Chapin's School in 1924. She then entered Cornell University for a short course in forestry.

Anna married three times. On June 5, 1926, she married Curtis Bean Dall, a New York stockbroker, in Hyde Park, New York. They had two children, Anna (Eleanor), born March 25, 1927, and Curtis Roosevelt, born April 19, 1930. The Dalls were divorced in July 1934, and Anna returned to her family, living in the White House. She then married Clarence John Boettiger, a journalist she met on her father's campaign train, in March 1935. They had one son, John Roosevelt Boettiger, born March 30, 1939. The two divorced in 1948. Her third husband was James A. Halsted, a physician, and the two remained married until Anna's death in 1975.

Anna's paternal grandmother, Sara Delano Roosevelt, exercised considerable influence over her son and grandchildren, and had a strained relationship with Eleanor. Anna's younger brother James later recalled his grandmother telling him, "Your mother only bore you. I am more your mother than your mother is."

=== Early career ===
Anna was active as an editor and journalist. Between 1932 and 1934 she was associate editor of a magazine called Babies Just Babies; hosted a radio program sponsored by Best and Company Department Store; and contributed articles to Liberty magazine. She also wrote two children's books, Scamper and Scamper's Christmas. After her second marriage, she moved to Seattle with her husband, where he was hired by William Randolph Hearst to be the editor of the Seattle Post Intelligencer. From December 1936 to September 1943 they ran the newspaper. Anna was editor of the women's page and a columnist for the newspaper. In 1942, Clarence Boettiger became concerned he was not doing his part for the war effort. He was given a leave of absence by Hearst and was appointed a captain in the Army.

=== Work in the White House and the Yalta Conference ===
After her husband joined the Army, and at her ailing father's request, Anna moved into the White House with her five-year-old son in 1944. Among other duties, she often served as hostess of the White House due to her mother's preference for devoting her time to other political activities and worthy causes. She also served as an unofficial secretary to her father. Her responsibilities included answering mail, arranging appointments, and writing presidential speeches. She became alarmed at the obvious deterioration of the President's health and insisted on seeking the advice of a cardiologist. When he was diagnosed with congestive heart failure, she was the only family member who was informed. She petitioned to be included in the Yalta Conference as his aide-de-camp, believing that she could best protect her father, seeing to it that he followed the doctor's orders of diet and rest. She attended the conference, along with Sarah Churchill, daughter of Prime Minister Winston Churchill, and Kathy Harriman, daughter of W. Averell Harriman, Ambassador to Russia. The conference lasted from February 2, 1945, to February 11, 1945. Anna was important to Roosevelt both personally and as aide-de-camp.

Anna Boettiger was a witness to many historic moments, but she also carried the burden of dealing with some of the most intimate and painful decisions of her parents during their unconventional marriage. After her father's death, Anna had to tell her mother that FDR had been with his long-time mistress, Lucy Mercer Rutherfurd. In addition, she told her that Franklin had continued the relationship for decades, and people surrounding him had hidden it from Eleanor.

=== Subsequent career and marriage ===
After Roosevelt's death in April 1945, William Randolph Hearst no longer had reason to favor Boettiger and they had a falling out. Boettiger left the Seattle Post Intelligencer and he and Anna bought a weekly newspaper in Phoenix, Arizona. They renamed it the Arizona Times and had turned it into a daily paper by May 1947. However, they were attempting to turn it into a left-leaning newspaper in Arizona, and the paper failed. The failure left the Boettigers bankrupt and put a great strain on their marriage. They divorced August 1, 1949. For a year after her divorce, she and Eleanor collaborated on a joint radio show called the Eleanor and Anna Roosevelt Program. She also edited a magazine called The Woman and contributed a series of articles called My Life with F.D.R.

In 1952 she married Dr. James Halsted, a doctor who was employed by the Veterans' Administration. They moved to New York where she took up work in public relations for hospitals and medical centers. The Halsteds moved to the Imperial State of Iran, where Halsted helped establish the Pahlavi University Medical School. Anna worked there in public relations and administration. When they returned to the United States, Anna immersed herself in humanitarian work and contributed to the legacy of both her parents.

In October 1963, Anna was appointed by President John F. Kennedy to the Citizen's Advisory Council on the Status of Women. In February of that year, she was appointed vice-chairman of the President's Commission for the Observance of Human Rights.

In 1971, the Halsteds retired to a cottage in Hillsdale, New York. Anna continued to be active in most of the same organizations until her death from throat cancer on December 1, 1975, aged 69, at Montefiore Hospital in the Bronx, New York.

== See also ==
- The Daughters of Yalta (2020) book
