= Curtis Bean Dall =

American stockbroker and candidate for vice-president of the United States

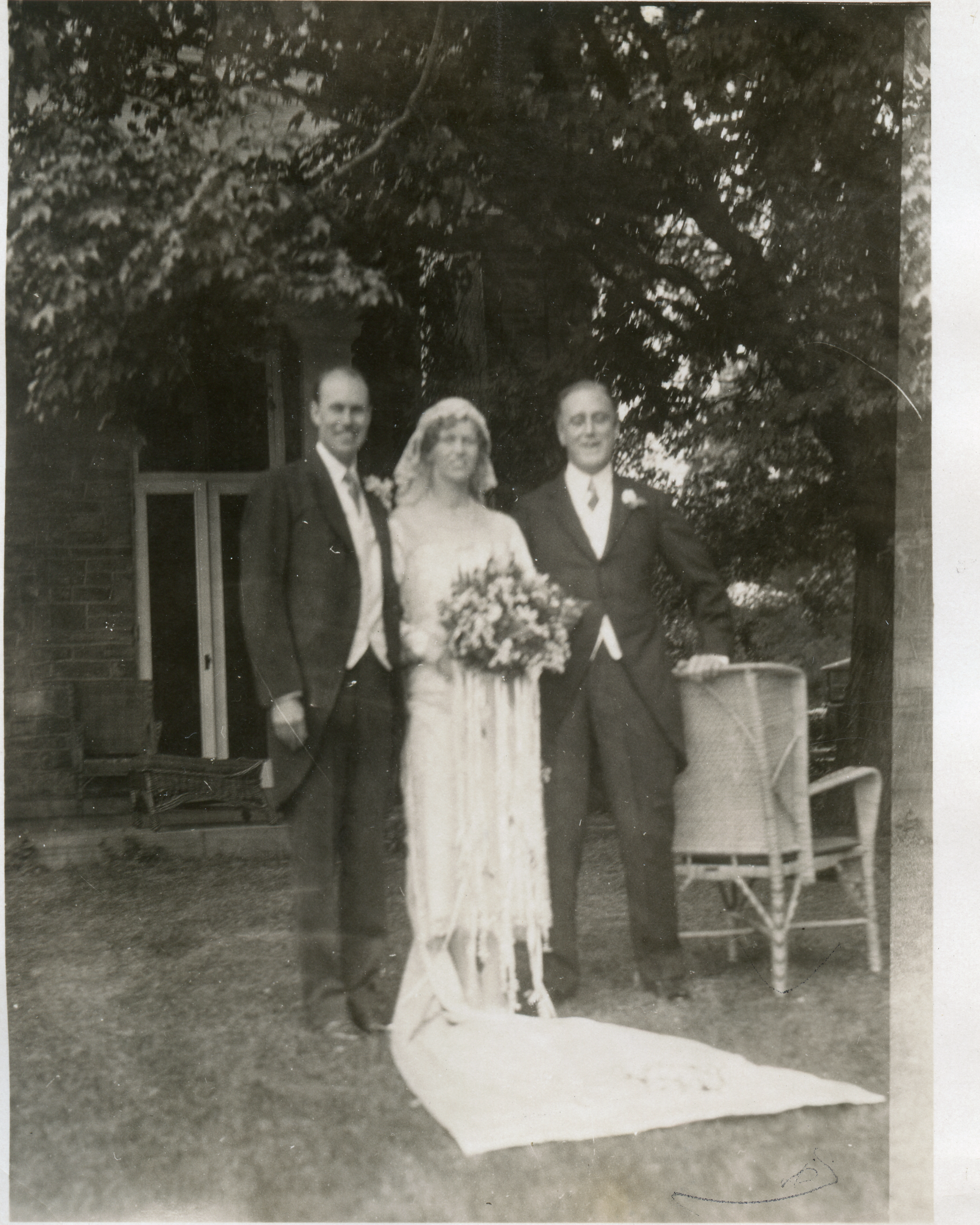
- Dall (left) posing with his then-wife Anna (center) and her father Franklin D. Roosevelt (right) on their 1926 wedding day
- Born: October 24, 1896; New York City, New York, U.S
- Died: June 28, 1991 (aged 94); Beaufort, South Carolina, U.S.
- Occupations: Stockbroker, Vice-Presidential candidate and author
- Spouse: Anna Roosevelt (m. 1926; div. 1934)
- Children: Anna; Curtis

Curtis Bean Dall (October 24, 1896 – June 28, 1991) was an American stockbroker, Vice-Presidential candidate, and author. He was also the first husband of Anna Eleanor Roosevelt, daughter of Franklin D. Roosevelt and Eleanor Roosevelt.

== Life and career ==
Curtis Bean Dall was born in New York City, to Charles Austin Dall and Mary Bean, and grew up on a farm in Piscataway, New Jersey. He attended Princeton University, and became a stockbroker. He married Anna Eleanor Roosevelt, daughter of Franklin D. Roosevelt and Eleanor Roosevelt, in 1926. Since Dall was prominent in Wall Street circles, his relationship with his in-laws was tense, but he wrote that he always got along well with FDR. The Dalls had two children: Anna Eleanor Roosevelt Dall ("Sistie", born in 1927) and Curtis Roosevelt Dall ("Buzzie", born in 1930). Curtis and Anna Roosevelt Dall were divorced in July 1934.

In World War I, Dall was commissioned an ensign in naval aviation and served in France, witnessing President Woodrow Wilson's arrival in Brest. In World War II, Colonel Dall served stateside in Army Air Forces staff positions. Although initially attempting to be loyal to the Roosevelt White House, irreconcilable philosophical and temperamental differences soon became apparent. By the time FDR became president, Anna already wanted to end the marriage, but due to image concerns agreed to allow brother Elliott Roosevelt to get "the first White House divorce" in 1933. Afterwards Dall was allowed limited contact with the Roosevelt family and Anna's two children with him. After the war, Dall moved to Texas and gradually became involved with right-wing fringe elements.

Curtis Dall is most well known in recent times for his book F.D.R.: My Exploited Father-in-Law, in which he speaks of his ex-father-in-law, and his relationship with, as he saw them, the corrupt power of the banking elite of the time. In reference to the Great Depression of the 1930s he states: "Actually it was the calculated 'shearing' of the public by the World Money-Powers, triggered by the planned sudden shortage of the supply of call money in the New York money market."

Dall's short memoir adds little to the history of the New Deal and skips over his relationship with Anna. Eleanor Roosevelt's and Anna's correspondence reveals that they loathed Dall, who admitted to be on acerbic terms with Louis Howe and other FDR advisers. The subtitle, My Exploited Father-in-Law, refers to Dall's belief that sinister forces, represented in part by Howe, Bernard Baruch, Louis Brandeis, Felix Frankfurter, and Henry Morgenthau Jr., manipulated FDR in the service of the "Godless Dictatorship" of the "One-Money-One-World-Super State".

Dall became convinced that an evil global conspiracy, which he traced back to the Illuminati, secretly controlled history for its own enrichment. He wrote: "I have depicted the "Goliath," here, and I have fashioned "A Stone for Goliath," as it were...Behold it: the Federal Reserve Board with its shadowy new international counterparts, the Council on Foreign Relations (CFR), Prince Bernhard's farflung Bilderberg Group and lastly their discredited stooge, the self-described United Nations."

Dall's memoir contains historically interesting details of his conversations with Commander George Howard Earle III, who while serving in Istanbul in 1943 attempted to negotiate a separate peace with Germany's Wilhelm Canaris and Franz von Papen; and with Admiral Husband Kimmel, who believed he was deliberately set up by the White House at Pearl Harbor.

Dall was the chairman of the board of the Amalgamated Broadcasting System.

Dall became involved with the "racist Right's ill-fated efforts at forming a third party" in 1960, when the Texas-based Constitution Party put-up retired Marine Corps Brigadier General Merritt B. Curtis for president, and Dall for vice-president.

In 1968, his name was filed for the New Hampshire primary. He was then a member of the Christian Crusade National Advisory Board and Chairman of "Liberty Lobby" Board of Policy. In 1971, he was Chairman of the Liberty Lobby.

He died in Arlington, Virginia in 1991, aged 94.

== Written works ==
=== Books ===
- F.D.R.: My Exploited Father-in-Law. Tulsa, Oklahoma: Christian Crusade Publications, 1967. ISBN 978-1937787288.
  - Amerikas Kriegspolitik – Roosevelt und seine Hintermänner. Tübingen, Germany: Grabert Verlag, 1972. ISBN 3878470266.
- Who Controls our Nation's Federal Policies — and Why? Torrance, California: Noontide Press, 1973.

=== Interviews ===
- Hilder, Anthony J. The War Lords of Washington (Secrets of Pearl Harbor): An Interview with Col. Curtis B. Dall. Spotlight, 1991. 45 pages. ISBN 978-0935036435.

== Sources ==
- Memorials > Curtis B. Daft '20, Princeton Alumni Weekly, June 3, 1992
- National Park Service bio of Anna
- Social Security Death Index
- "Curtis Bean Dall" on OneWorldTree, hosted at Ancestry.com (subscription required)
- Syracuse Herald, Jul 6, 1936. Picture of Curtis B Dall with his two children
- Syracuse Herald Journal, Feb 2, 1968. Picture. Name filed for New Hampshire Presidential primary
- Dall, Curtis: My Exploited Father-in-Law, Christian Crusade Publications, Tulsa, OK, 1968.
- Hansen, Chris: Enfant Terrible: The Times and Schemes of General Elliott Roosevelt, Able Baker Press, Tucson, AZ, 2012.
- Roosevelt, Curtis: Too Close to the Sun, Public Affairs, New York, 2008.
