= John Roosevelt Boettiger =

American psychologist

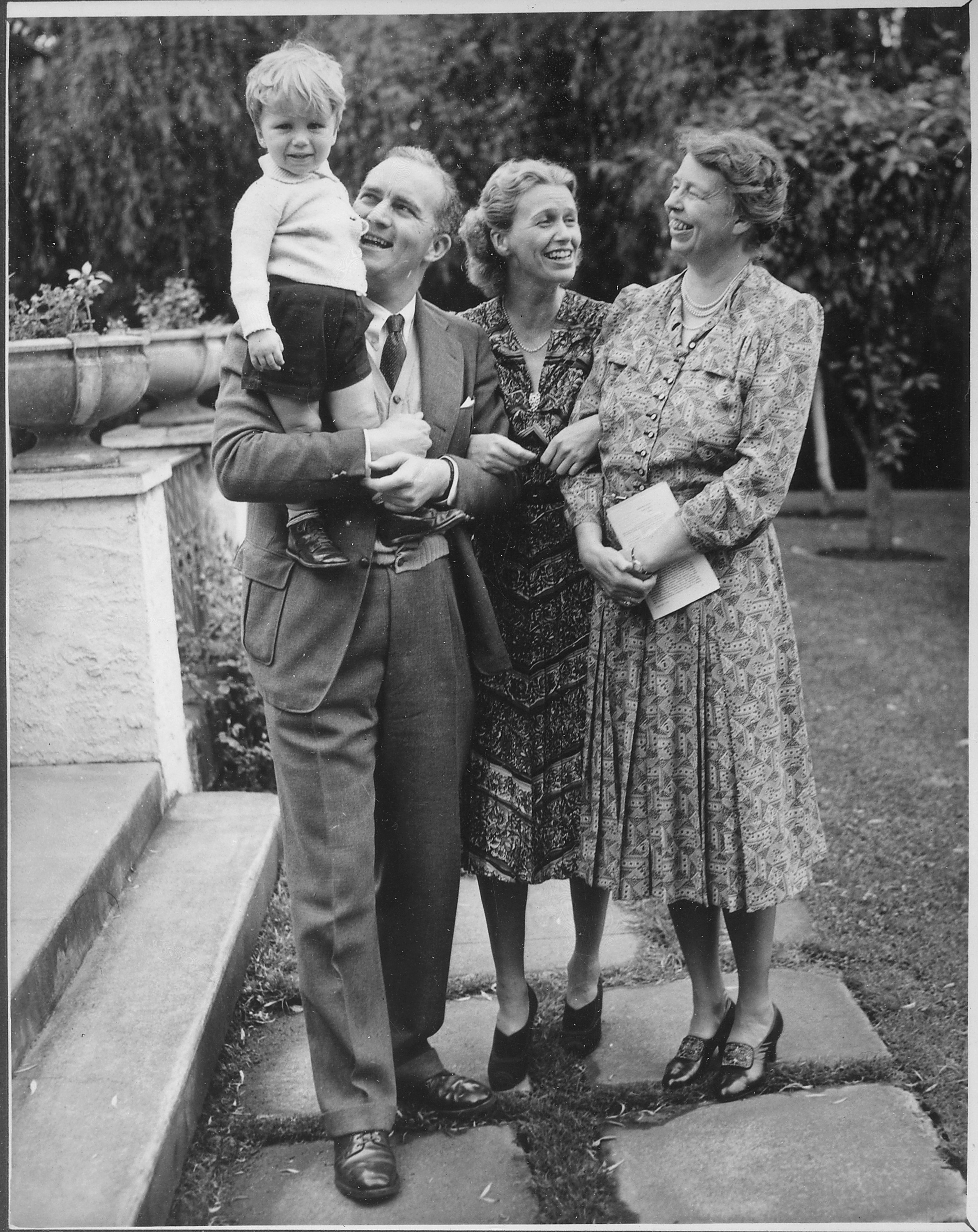
- Boettiger (left) with his parents and grandmother in 1942
- Born: March 30, 1939 (age 87); Seattle, Washington, U.S.
- Occupation: Professor of psychology (retired)
- Spouse: Leigh McCullough
- Children: 4
- Parent(s): Clarence John Boettiger; Anna Roosevelt
- Family: Roosevelt

John Roosevelt Boettiger (born March 30, 1939) is a retired professor of developmental and clinical psychology, and the son of Anna Roosevelt Boettiger and her second husband, Clarence John Boettiger. He is a grandson of U.S. President Franklin Delano Roosevelt and Eleanor Roosevelt. He lives in northern California.

== Early life and family ==
As a child, Boettiger lived with his mother in the White House during World War II while his grandfather was president. His parents divorced in 1949, and his father committed suicide the following year. His mother remarried to James Addison Halsted on November 11, 1952. She died on December 1, 1975.

As a college student at Amherst College he lived and traveled with his grandmother Eleanor Roosevelt and joined her in work on behalf of the United Nations. He served as national president of the Collegiate Council for the United Nations from 1958 to 1960, and also served on the board of the American Association for the United Nations.

== Career ==
Boettiger served for 21 years as professor of human development at Hampshire College in Amherst, Massachusetts, of which he was founding faculty member. He created and was chairman of Hampshire's interdisciplinary Human Development Program. Leaving Hampshire to work with graduate students in clinical psychology, he was professor of psychology and dean of student affairs at the California School of Professional Psychology in San Francisco and Berkeley, California. From 2007 to 2010 he was professor in the Research Institute of Modum Bad Psychiatric Center in Vikersund, Norway.

He is chairman of the board and president of the Christopher Reynolds Foundation, on whose board he has served for nearly 50 years. Trained as a political scientist at Columbia University before moving to a career in psychology, he taught at his alma mater Amherst College, was a consultant to and member of the Social Science Department of the RAND Corporation, and briefly served as a desk officer at the United States Department of State. He holds a Ph.D. in developmental and clinical psychology, for which his principal mentor was Erik H. Erikson of Harvard University.

Earlier in his career, Boettiger wrote on educational and political themes, including two books on United States policy in Vietnam. He has an interest in the intersections of social history, memory, narrative, family dynamics, and life cycle human development, themes explored in his biography of his parents' lives and their family histories, A Love in Shadow, published by W.W. Norton in 1978. More recently he published a monograph, "A Resource for Healing and Renewal," about Modum Bad, a healing community, research center and psychiatric hospital in Vikersund, Norway. Since 2000, Boettiger has edited and written an online journal, "Reckonings: a Journal of Justice, Hope and History." He continues to edit research papers of clinicians and research psychologists at Modum Bad in Norway, and is a member of the advisory board of The Living New Deal in Berkeley, California.

== Personal life ==
Boettiger married first Deborah Ann Bentley (b. May 6, 1938) on August 20, 1960, in Syracuse, New York. They had two children, a son and a daughter. He married secondly Janet Roslyn Adler (b. February 20, 1941) on July 21, 1971. They had two sons. He married thirdly Nancy Smalley (b. April 3, 1941) in June 1989. All three of these marriages ended in divorce.

He was married for a fourth time to Leigh McCullough, who before her death in 2012 was clinical professor of psychology at Harvard Medical School and Director of the Research Institute at Modum Bad Psychiatric Center in Vikersund, Norway. Boettiger also has eight grandchildren and two great-grandchildren.
