= Isaac Carow =

American banker and merchant (1778–1850)

President of the Chamber of Commerce of the State of New York
- In office 1840–1842
- Preceded by: Robert Lenox
- Succeeded by: James De Peyster Ogden

Personal details
- Born: Isaac Quentin Carow; March 29, 1778 Saint Croix, West Indies
- Died: September 3, 1850 (aged 72) Manhattan, New York
- Spouse: Eliza Mowatt (m. 1803; died 1837)
- Relations: Edith Carow Roosevelt (granddaughter)
- Children: 8, including Charles

Isaac Quentin Carow (March 29, 1778 – September 3, 1850) was an American banker and merchant. He was the father of Charles Carow, and grandfather of Edith Carow Roosevelt, wife of Theodore Roosevelt.

== Early life ==
Carow was born on March 29, 1778, in Saint Croix in the West Indies Islands. He was the son of merchant Isaac Carow and Ann (née Cooper) Carow.

His paternal grandfather was Josué Quereau, a Huguenot who immigrated from France to New York before or during 1721 and married Judith Quantin in 1721.

== Career ==
In 1793, Carow relocated to New York to obtain an academic education. He partnered with Robert Kermit to form the shipping line known as Kermit & Carow which made him a large fortune. In New York, he became a warden of St. Mark's Episcopal Church, a governor of New York Hospital, a member of the New York Bible Society (serving as vice president), and a promoter of the New York Society Library. He was one of the fifteen members of the Committee of arrangements for the celebration of the Erie Canal.

He served as president of the Chamber of Commerce of the State of New York from 1840 to 1842, and was an original incorporator and director of the Bank of Commerce in New York.

== Personal life ==
On June 30, 1803, Carow was married to his cousin, Eliza Mowatt (1783–1837). Together, they lived at 25 St Marks Place in a Federal style townhouse built in 1831, and were the parents of eight children, including:

- Ann Eliza Carow (1804–1879), who married Robert Kermit, owner of the Red Star Line, in 1832.
- John Carow (b. 1805), who died young.
- Jane Carow (1807–1830)
- Julia Carow (1813–1867), who married Edward Fisher Sanderson (d. 1866), a steel manufacturer of Endcliffe Grange in Sheffield, England.
- Mary Carow (1816–1864), who married James P. Thomas.
- Charles Carow (1825–1883), who married Gertrude Elizabeth Tyler, a daughter of Brig. Gen. Daniel Tyler.
- Laura Frances Carow (1827–1872)

In 1815 and 1827 he visited Europe, staying with the Marquis de Lafayette in France during the latter sojourn. In 1835, when the St. Nicholas Society was formed, Carow was one of 275 men invited to join it.

His wife Eliza died in May 1837. Carow died on September 3, 1850, in New York City. After his death and the payment of all bequests and legacies, he left an estate valued at $146,681.

=== Descendants ===
Through his eldest son Charles, he was a grandfather of Edith Kermit Carow (1861–1948), the second wife of President Theodore Roosevelt and the first lady of the United States during his presidency; Emily Tyler Carow (1865–1939); and Kermit Carow (1860–1860), who died in infancy.

Through his daughter Julia, he was a grandfather of Mary Sanderson (d. 1899), who married her second cousin Thomas Sanderson Furniss (and was the father of educationalist and socialist politician Henry Sanderson Furniss, 1st Baron Sanderson); Frances Ann Sanderson, who married New York State Assemblyman Samuel William Johnson (a descendant of William Samuel Johnson); Helen Augusta Sanderson, who married Dr. Charles Elam; Laura Carow Sanderson, who married Camidge, and Thomas Sanderson.
