= Stephen Whitney (ship) =

American passenger and cargo ship; wrecked off the southern Irish coast in 1847

Coordinates: 51°28′03″N 9°31′03″W

History

United States
- Namesake: Stephen Whitney
- Owner: Robert Kermit Red Star Line
- Fate: Wrecked 10 November 1847

General characteristics
- Tonnage: 1034 tons

Stephen Whitney was a passenger-carrying sailing ship which was wrecked on West Calf Island off the southern coast of Ireland on 10 November 1847 with the loss of 92 of the 110 passengers and crew aboard. She was a packet ship in Robert Kermit's Red Star Line. The ship was named after a Kermit investor, New York merchant Stephen Whitney.

The 1,034-ton ship left New York City on 18 October for Liverpool carrying passengers and a cargo which included corn, raw cotton, cheese, resin, and 20 boxes of clocks. On 10 November in thick fog, the captain, C.W. Popham, mistook the Crookhaven lighthouse for the one at the Old Head of Kinsale, and the lighthouse on Cape Clear Island was obscured by fog compounding the error in navigation. At around 10 pm, the ship struck the western tip of West Calf Island, completely breaking up within about ten minutes.

The loss of the ship triggered the decision to replace the Cape Clear Island lighthouse with one on Fastnet Rock. This decision was also because the lighthouse on Cape Clear was often shrouded in fog or low level cloud, which made it hard or at times impossible to see.
