= Samuel William Johnson (assemblyman) =

American politician

Member of the New York State Assembly for Westchester Co., 2nd District
- In office January 1, 1883 – December 31, 1885
- Preceded by: William H. Catlin
- Succeeded by: Norman A. Lawlor

Personal details
- Born: October 27, 1828 New York City, New York, U.S.
- Died: November 25, 1895 (aged 67) Mamaroneck, New York, U.S.
- Party: Democratic
- Spouse: Frances Ann Sanderson (m. 1859; died 1879)
- Relations: Theodore Dwight Woolsey (uncle); William Samuel Johnson (great-grandfather)
- Children: 3
- Parent(s): William Samuel Johnson; Laura Woolsey Johnson
- Education: Princeton College; Harvard Law School
- Occupation: Attorney, politician

Samuel William Johnson (October 27, 1828 – November 25, 1895) was an American lawyer and Democratic politician from New York.

== Early life ==
Johnson was born in New York City on October 27, 1828. He was the second child and eldest son of William Samuel Johnson (1795–1883) and Laura (née Woolsey) Johnson. His father was a New York lawyer and a New York State Senator.

His great-grandfather was William Samuel Johnson, signor of the U.S. Constitution and U.S. Senator, and his great-great grandfather was Dr. Samuel Johnson, a prominent Connecticut clergyman who was the first president of King's College. His maternal grandparents were Elizabeth (née Dwight) Woolsey (sister of Timothy Dwight IV) and William Walton Woolsey. His uncle was Theodore Dwight Woolsey, president of Yale University.

After preparatory school, Johnson graduated from Princeton College in 1849 and from Harvard Law School in 1851. After law school, he entered the law office of District Attorney N. Bowditch Blunt.

== Career ==
After being admitted to the bar in 1852, Johnson moved to Cattaraugus County, New York where he practiced law and was a land office proprietor for thirteen years. In 1865, he moved to Rye Neck (today known as Mamaroneck) where he was elected supervisor of the town of Rye nine times and served as chairman of the board of supervisors for two years. He served as a director of the North River Insurance Company was a trustee of the Port Chester Savings Bank for many years.

From 1853 to 1872, he held commissions from New York, the final being Brigadier General on the staff of Governor John T. Hoffman. In 1871, he was appointed Commissary General and Chief of Ordnance for New York State. From January 1, 1883 to December 31, 1885, Johnson served as a Democratic member of the 106th, 107th, and 108th New York State Legislatures. He was one of three Assemblyman representing Westchester County.

== Personal life ==
On March 1, 1859, Johnson was married to Frances Ann "Fannie" Sanderson. She was a daughter of Julia (née Carow) Sanderson (daughter of Isaac Carow and sister of Charles Carow) and Edward Fisher Sanderson, a prominent steel manufacturer from Sheffield, England. Frances' sister Mary was the mother of educationalist and socialist politician Henry Sanderson Furniss, 1st Baron Sanderson, and her cousin was Edith Carow Roosevelt, the second wife of President Theodore Roosevelt. Together, Frances and Samuel were the parents of three children, two of whom died in infancy. Their surviving son was:

- William Samuel Johnson (1859–), an attorney and author who married Carrie R. (née Gately) Beers, daughter of D.C. and Olive F. Gately, in 1894.

He was a member of the Manhattan Club, the University Club, the St. Nicholas Society.

Johnson died at his home on Boston Post Road in Rye Neck on November 25, 1895.

New York State Assembly
Preceded by William H. Catlin	New York State Assembly; Westchester County, 2nd District; 1883–1885	Succeeded by Norman A. Lawlor
