= Edith Derby Williams =

American historian

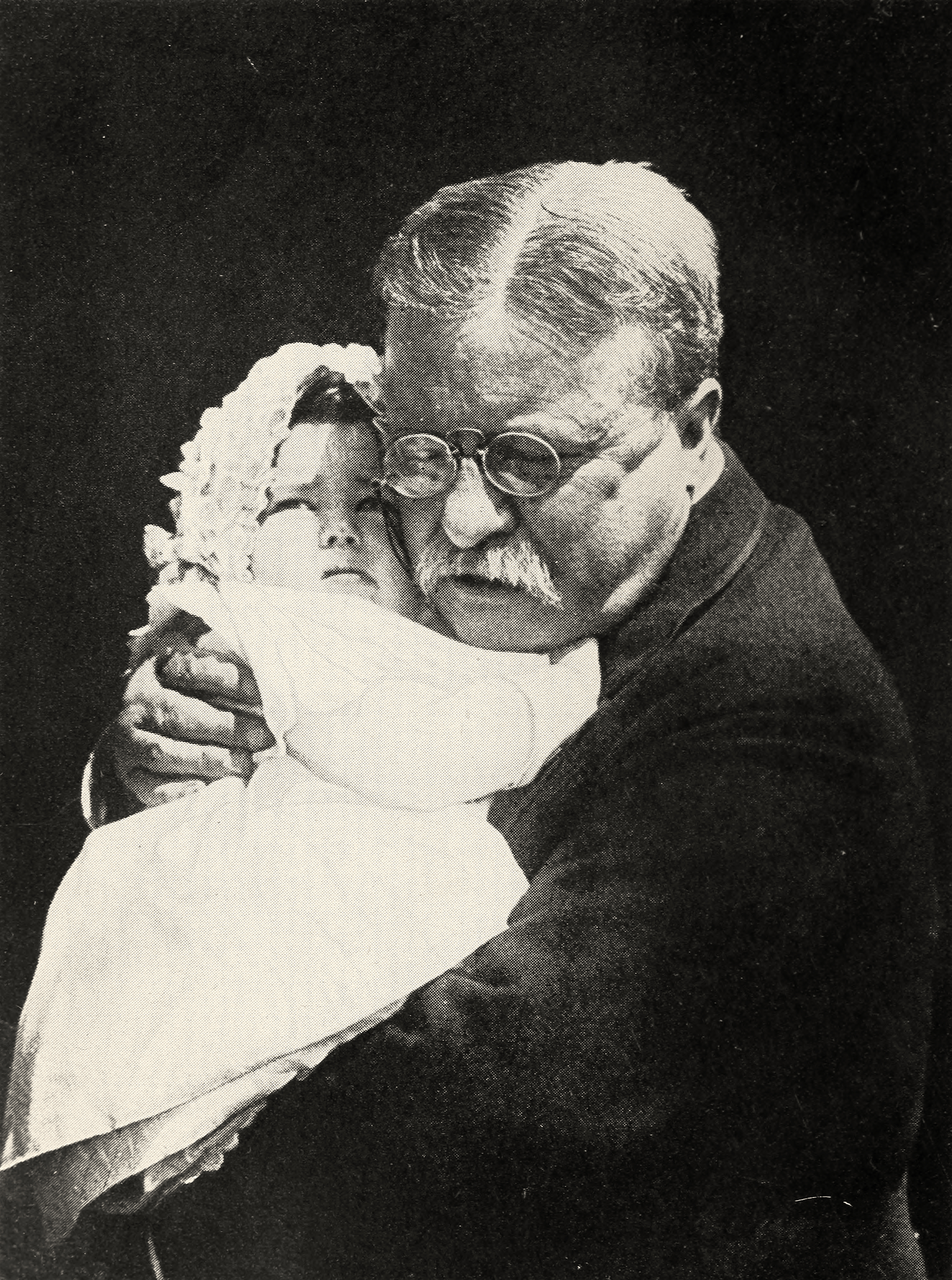
- Edith Roosevelt Derby being held by her grandfather, Theodore Roosevelt
- Born: Edith Roosevelt Derby; June 17, 1917; New York City, New York, U.S.
- Died: June 8, 2008 (aged 90); Vashon, Washington, U.S.
- Spouse: Andrew Murray Williams (m. 1941; died 1998)
- Children: 3
- Relatives: Roosevelt family

Edith Roosevelt Derby Williams (June 17, 1917 – June 8, 2008) was an American historian and conservationist. She was a member of the Roosevelt family and a granddaughter of the 26th president of the United States Theodore Roosevelt.

== Biography ==
Williams was born as Edith Roosevelt Derby in New York City to Dr. Richard Derby and Ethel Carow Roosevelt of the Roosevelt family. She was the second child of Dr. and Mrs. Derby and the eldest daughter. Her maternal grandparents were President Theodore Roosevelt and First Lady Edith Roosevelt. She was actively involved in Republican politics and addressed the 1960 Republican National Convention, seconding the nomination of Richard Nixon. Later she founded the Vashon Island Health Center. For forty years, she was the Republican Committeewoman for the state of Washington. In 1975, Williams was named to the board of trustees for the University of Washington, where she served until 1981. Mrs. Williams served on the board of trustees for the Theodore Roosevelt Association where she received the Rose Award in 2004 for her many years of service and dedication to the organization. Williams was also recognised for her work in behalf of conservation and promoting a healthier environment by reducing pollution.

In 1941, she married Andrew "Mike" Murray Williams (1916–1998). After World War II in 1946, the family moved to Washington and settled in the Seattle area. They lived on Federal Ave in the Capitol Hill neighborhood of Seattle in a home designed and built by the legendary architect, Carl Gould. The home contained several important historical artifacts including china from the Roosevelt White House, pieces of which are in the Smithsonian. The family had three children, Andrew Murray Jr. (1942–2004), Richard Derby (born 1944), and Sarah Gilmore (born 1948). Bruce K. Chapman is her son-in-law and husband to Sarah.

Williams died on June 8, 2008 after breaking her hip at her Vashon Island, Washington home. She was 90.
