= Samuel W. Johnson =

Samuel W. Johnson may refer to:

- Samuel Waite Johnson (1831–1912), English railway engineer
- Samuel William Johnson (chemist) (1830–1909), American agricultural chemist
- Samuel William Johnson (assemblyman) (1828–1895), American lawyer and politician from New York
- Sam Johnson (footballer, born 1992), English footballer
