= Adam-Derby House =

Historic house in New York, United States

- U.S. National Register of Historic Places
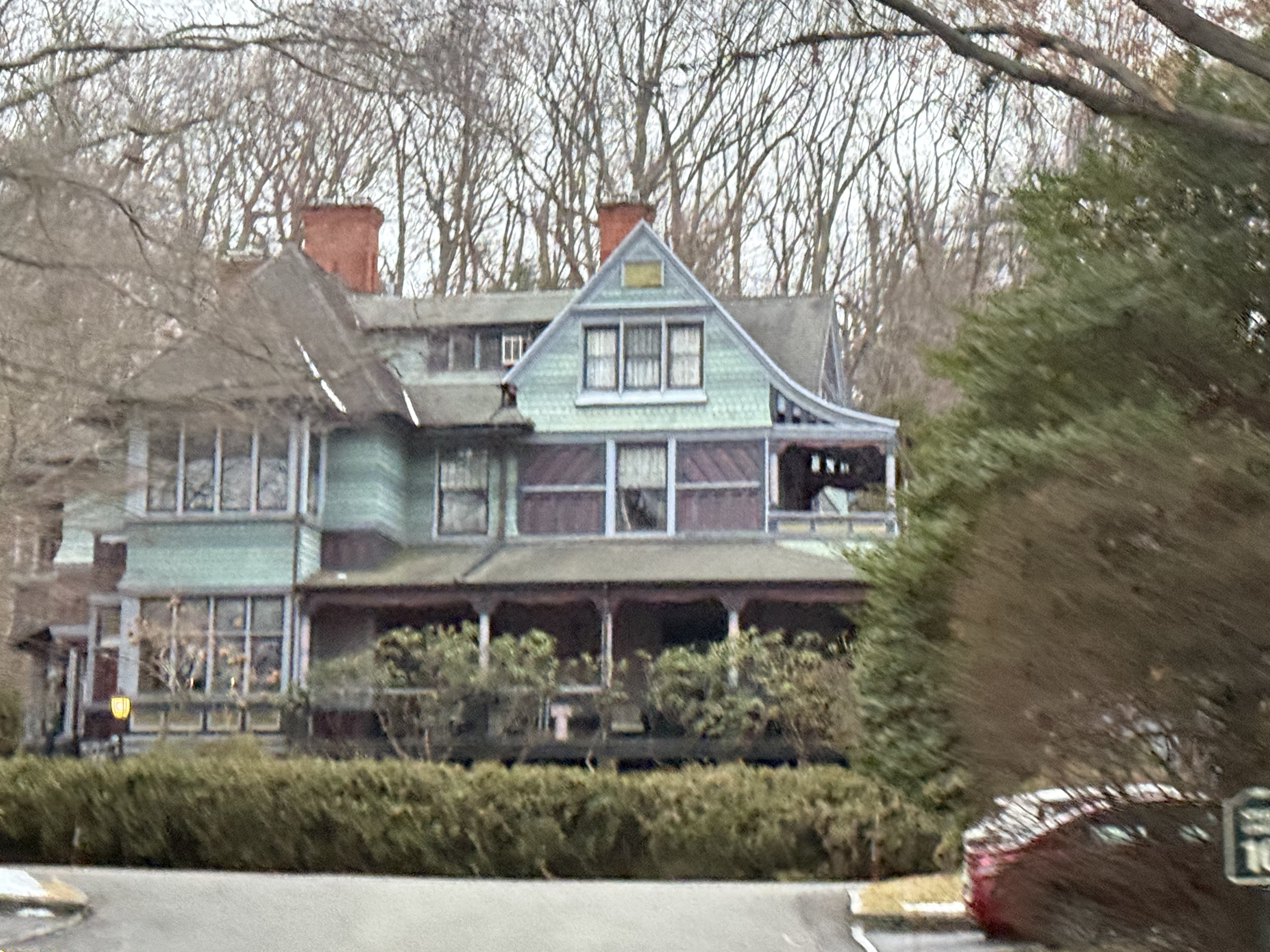
- Adam Derby House in 2025.

- Location within New York Location within the United States
- Location: 166 Lexington Ave., Oyster Bay, New York
- Coordinates: 40°52′2″N 73°32′5″W
- Area: 5.4 acres (2.2 ha)
- Built: 1878
- Architect: Potter, William Appleton; Robertson, Robert Henderson
- Architectural style: Queen Anne
- NRHP reference No.: 79001597
- Added to NRHP: May 17, 1979

The Adam-Derby House is a notable 19th-century shingle style house, designed in the Queen Anne style, located at 166 Lexington Avenue in Oyster Bay, New York.

== Description and history ==
It was built in 1878 and designed by architects William Appleton Potter (1842–1909) and Robert Henderson Robertson (1849–1919) during their partnership as Potter & Robertson. From 1914 to 1977, it was the home of Ethel Roosevelt Derby (1891–1977), daughter of President Theodore Roosevelt. It is a 2 1/2- to 3-story dwelling with a wood exterior resting on a brick foundation in the Queen Anne style. It features a variety of exterior detailing and turned post supports supporting the bracketed roofs of the verandahs, porches, and porte cochere.

It was listed on the National Register of Historic Places on May 17, 1979.
