= Robert Kermit =

19th-century American shipowner and businessman

- Born: September 4, 1794; New York City
- Died: March 13, 1855 (aged 60); New York City
- Spouse: Ann Eliza Carow (m. 1832)

Robert Kermit (September 4, 1794 – March 13, 1855) was an American shipowner and owner of the Red Star Line (also called the Kermit Line).

== Early life ==
Kermit was the son of Captain Henry Kermit and Elizabeth (Ferguson) Kermit. His father had been master of the brig Morning Star (which traded to the West Indies) for many years.

== Career ==
Robert Kermit gained a mercantile training in the shipping house of William Codman. With his brother Henry – a skilled bookkeeper – he began business in 1817 at 84 Greenwich Street in New York. They purchased the ship Aurora to run in the Liverpool packet trade. In 1827, after the death of his brother, Kermit performed business as an agent for packet ships to and from Liverpool. Within a few years he rapidly increased the number of his ships and soon became one of the major ship-owners of the country.

=== Kermit and Carow ===
By 1834, Robert Kermit already owned St. George, and persuaded Stephen Whitney and Nathaniel Prime to become owners in a new ship, St. Andrew. This was the beginning of the Saint Line. Despite making some very profitable deals, Kermit, Prime, and Whitney could not keep the Saint Line solvent.

After the Saint Line foundered, Kermit relocated his company to 74 South Street, and on September 11, 1835 purchased the old and popular Red Star Line of Liverpool packets, established in 1818 by Byrnes, Trimble & Co. In 1837, Kermit became a director of the Mutual Insurance Company and in 1847 director of the Knickerbocker Fire Insurance Company.

In this period, he commissioned the construction of a few new ships, including West Point (or Westpoint), that finally sailed with the flag of the Red Star Line. Other Red Star ships included John R. Skeddy (1845), Constellation (1849), Underwriter (1850), Waterloo, John Jay, England, Virginian, Samuel Hicks, Stephen Whitney, United States, and Sheffield.

Unlike other operators, Kermit owned shares in all the ships of the line, while the rest of them were owned mainly by various ship builders and ship captains. With Kermit's management, several misadventures and shipwrecks occurred, but due to the quality of the ships and their speed and regularity, the performance of Red Star Line was better than it had been.

In the pressure of competition, packet schedules were abbreviated when reorganizing sailings due to disasters, new launchings, etc. In 1844-1848, several ships made three-month round trips instead of the traditional four months, measured from one Liverpool departure to the next one. West Point, Waterloo, and especially Virginian were among the fastest of the North Atlantic route. Virginian also was one of the most susceptible ships and often ended in reporting problems and misadventures.

For many years, Kermit operated the line in his own name (it was often called Kermit Line). In 1850, Kermit's father-in-law, Isaac Quentin Carow, died. Kermit never had children of his own; this is part of the reason Kermit developed an almost paternal relationship with his brother-in-law, Charles Carow, who was 21 years younger than his sister Ann Eliza. Kermit took Carow into partnership as Kermit & Carow, to perform the business of general ship-owning, commission, and commercial trading. After 1851 he was associated with his brother-in-law, Charles Carow.

== Personal life ==
On December 4, 1832, Kermit married Ann Eliza Carow, eldest daughter of his business partner Isaac Quentin Carow and Eliza Mowatt.

Kermit died at his residence, 50 East 14th Street, age 60.
