= Ethel Roosevelt Derby =

Daughter of Theodore Roosevelt (1891–1977)

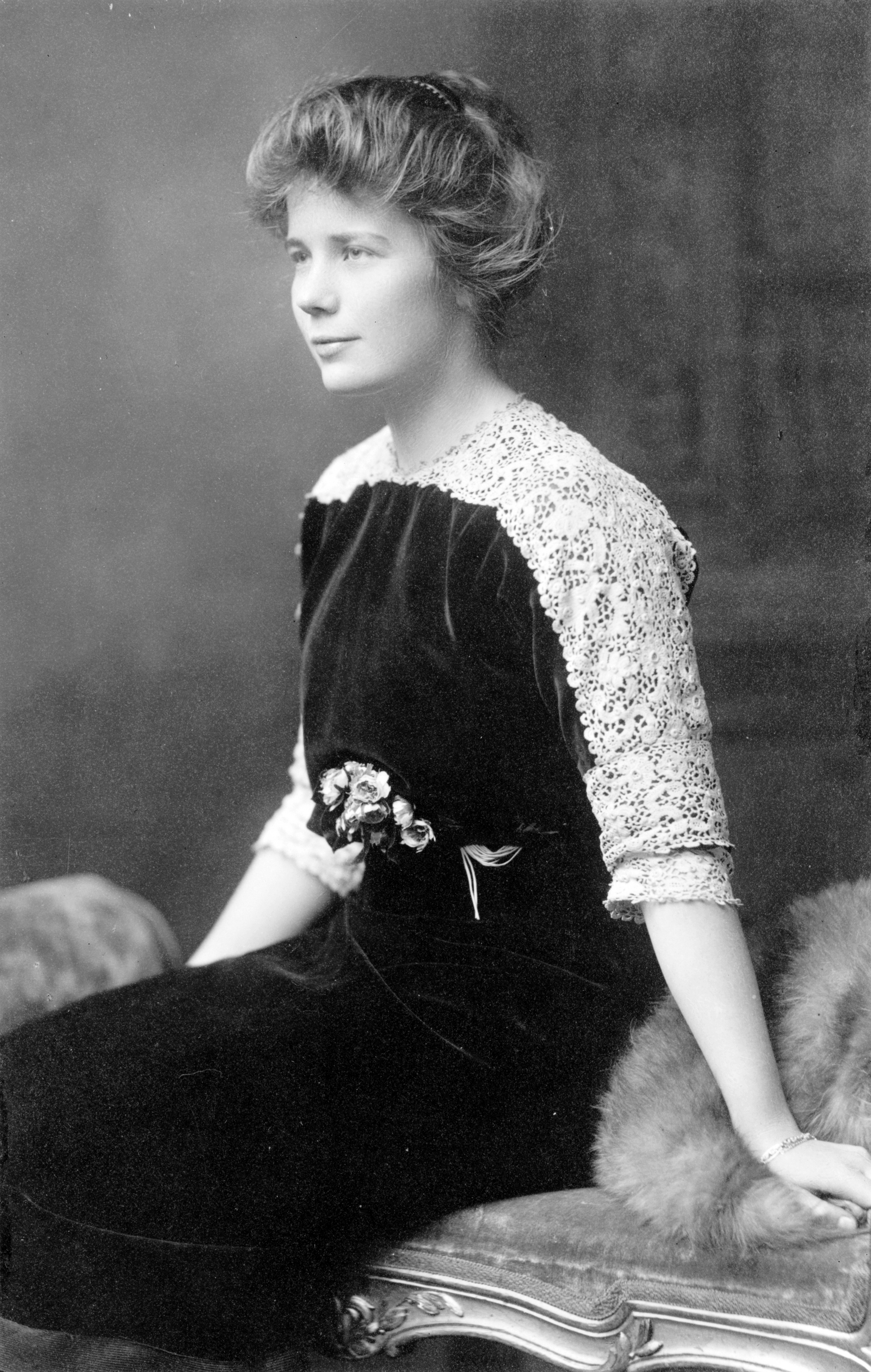
- Roosevelt in 1912
- Born: Ethel Carow Roosevelt; August 13, 1891; Oyster Bay, New York, U.S.
- Died: December 10, 1977 (aged 86); Oyster Bay, New York, U.S.
- Spouse: Richard Derby (m. 1913; died 1963)
- Children: Richard Jr.; Edith; Sarah; Judith
- Parent(s): Theodore Roosevelt; Edith Roosevelt
- Relatives: Roosevelt family

Ethel Carow Derby (née Roosevelt; August 13, 1891 – December 10, 1977) was the youngest daughter and fourth child of Theodore Roosevelt, 26th President of the United States. Known as "The Queen" or "The First Lady of Oyster Bay" by its Long Island residents, Ethel was instrumental in preserving both the legacy of her father as well as the family home, Sagamore Hill for future generations, especially after the death of her mother, Edith, in 1948.

== Early life and education ==
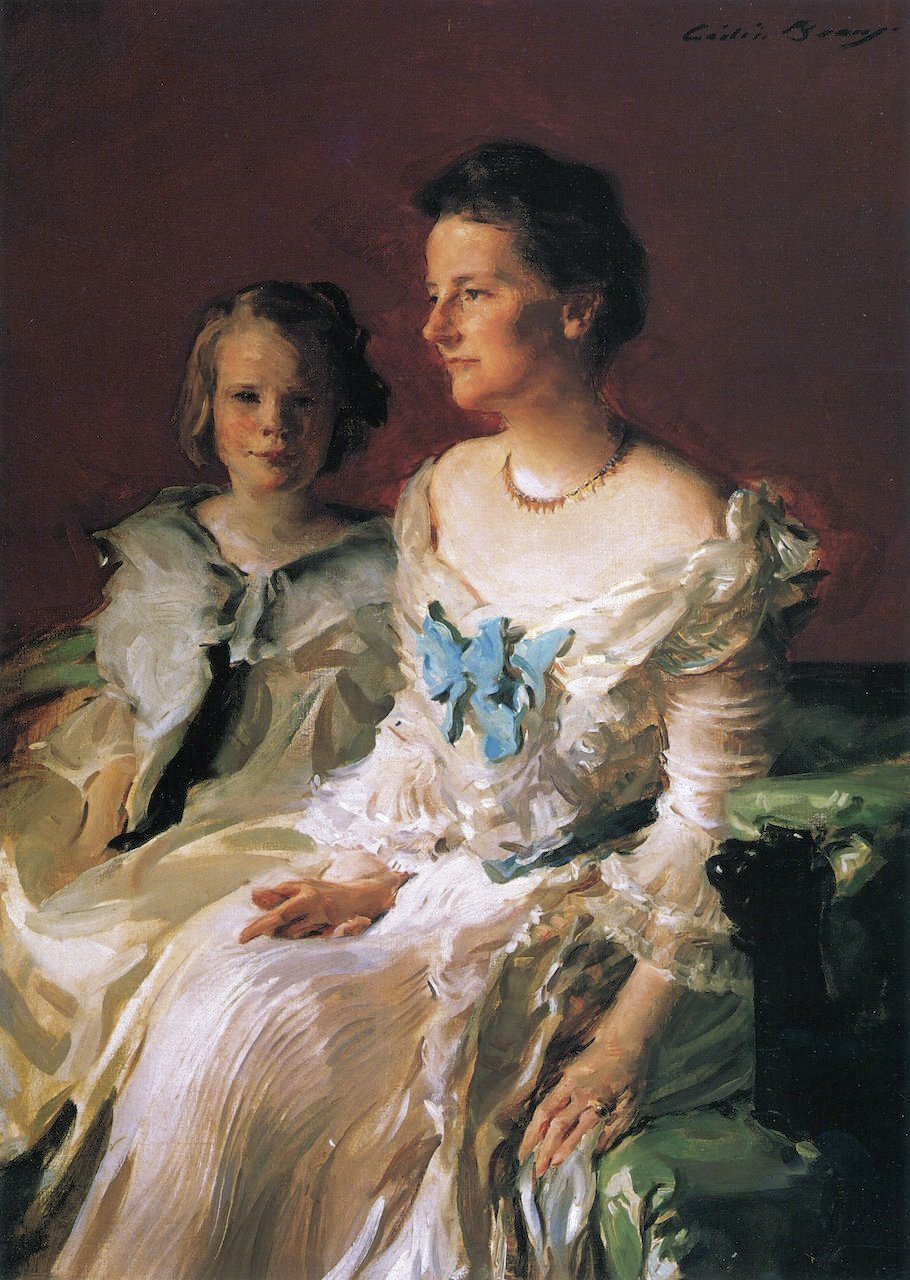
A 1902 painting of Roosevelt and daughter Ethel by Cecilia Beaux

Ethel Carow Roosevelt was born in Oyster Bay, New York, on Long Island on August 13 1891, to Theodore Roosevelt and Edith Kermit Carow. She had a half-sister Alice, and four brothers; Ted (Theodore III), Kermit, Archie, and Quentin. From an early age, young Ethel Carow showed practical leadership qualities. Her father once remarked: "she had a way of doing everything and managing everybody." At Sagamore Hill, Ethel actively took part in all the games, and especially enjoyed horseback riding with her mother.

== White House years ==
Ethel at the White House in the fall of 1901

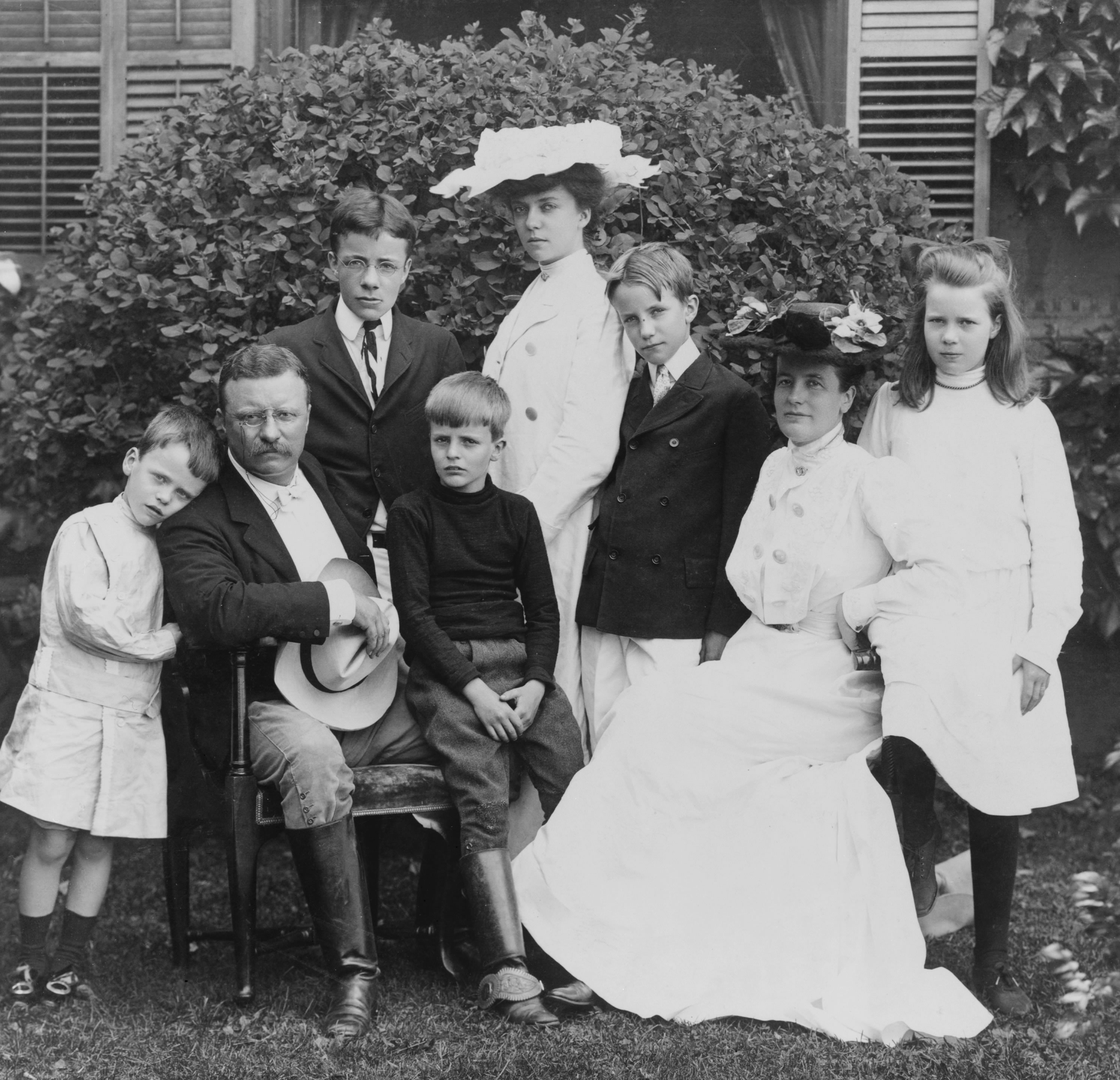
The Roosevelt family in 1903 with Quentin on the left, TR, Ted Jr., "Archie", Alice, Kermit, Edith, and Ethel

In the White House, Ethel often filled in for her mother by placing meal orders and delegating tasks to the staff. She was only 10 years old when her father became President after William McKinley's assassination in 1901.

During her family's years in the White House, Ethel tried to keep as low a profile possible because she did not seem to enjoy the attention as much as her half-sister Alice Roosevelt did. She was also encouraged to maintain her low-key persona by her mother Edith, who believed that a woman only made the news to announce her birth, marriage and death. Ethel attended school at the National Cathedral and had difficulty making friends due to her father's position. Just months before the Roosevelts' departure from the White House, Ethel had her debut and "Coming Out" party in the White House on December 28, 1908, aged 17.

== Service ==
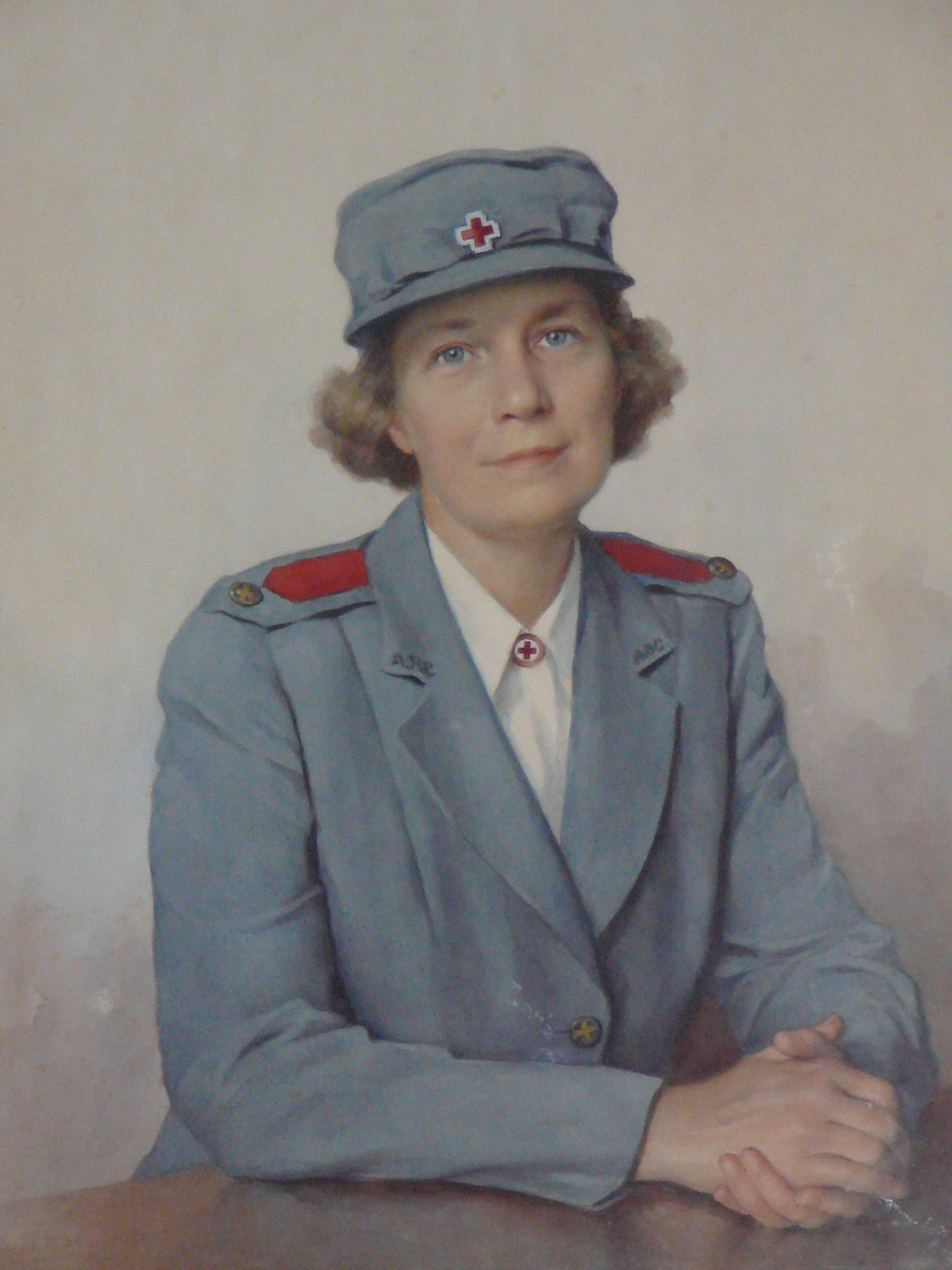
Elizabeth Shoumatoff's portrait of Ethel wearing her World War II Red Cross uniform.

During World War I, Ethel, now a nurse, served in France in the same hospital where her husband served as a surgeon. Later, she became involved with the Red Cross, and served as Nassau County Chairman during World War II, and then as Chairman of the Nassau County Nursing Service. Her long involvement, even while traveling, is shown by her correspondence still residing in the Nassau County Red Cross archives. When the Red Cross brought her Fifty Year Service Pin to Sagamore Hill, they had to correct themselves—it was not fifty years of service, it was sixty. When it came time to have her portrait painted, she did not choose to wear an evening gown and jewels, she wore her Red Cross uniform. She put in many years of work to turn Sagamore Hill into a National Historic Site. She was one of the first two women to serve on the Board of Trustees of the American Museum of Natural History.

== Marriage and family ==
On April 4, 1913, she married Richard Derby, a surgeon, who founded Glen Cove Community Hospital on Long Island. Mrs. Derby helped his efforts in France during World War I where she served as a nurse in the American Ambulance Hospital. Ethel was the first of T.R.'s children to serve in the war. An account of the participation of T.R.'s children and grandchildren in World Wars 1 and 2 can be found in the book by Eleanor Butler Roosevelt, titled The Day Before Yesterday; The Reminiscences of Mrs. Theodore Roosevelt, Jr. 1959, Garden City New York, Doubleday.

Ethel's marriage produced four children:

- Richard Derby Jr. (1914–1922) who died at age eight of sepsis
- Edith Roosevelt Derby (1917–2008) who married Andrew Murray "Mike" Williams and resided until her death in Washington state on Vashon Island and in Seattle.
- Sarah Alden Derby (1920–1999), who married Vermont State Senator Robert T. Gannett.
- Judith Quentin Derby (1923–1973), who married Adelbert "Del" Ames III.

== Later life and death ==
In her later years, Derby devoted more time to the American Civil Rights Movement, a cause to which she had long been devoted. She worked on a smaller scale, though no less committed, than her first cousin Eleanor Roosevelt, and believed in solving local problems before working nationally. Ethel Derby worked actively with local Black leaders to help get their concerns addressed. Her friends and family would often meet those Black leaders when visiting her house.

When she felt Black residents were being discriminated against, Derby formed a committee to bring low-income housing into Oyster Bay. The proposal initially was rebuffed by most of the residents. Ethel had her friends meet at her house where she convinced them that this was a good idea and the housing project was successfully completed.

In 1960 Derby, along with her daughter Edith, made a seconding speech for the nomination of Richard Nixon at the Republican National Convention. By 1975, Derby was in visibly weak condition. In 1977 she made her final visit to the White House to see Jimmy Carter and his wife Rosalynn. On December 10, 1977, she died at the Adam-Derby House in Oyster Bay, New York, aged 86 after suffering from bronchitis; she was buried in the nearby Youngs Memorial Cemetery where her parents, husband and other relatives are also buried. Johns Hopkins' Dr. Ethel Derby Weld Bailey, Ethel Derby's great great-niece, who was born almost 2 months before Ethel's death, was named after Ethel by her mother and father: Susan Roosevelt Weld, one of Ethel Derby's great-nieces, and her husband, William Weld, former Governor of Massachusetts.
