= Charles Carow =

American merchant and shipowner (1825–1883)

- Born: October 4, 1825; New York City, New York
- Died: March 18, 1883 (aged 57); New York City, New York
- Education: Columbia University
- Occupations: Merchant, shipowner
- Spouse: Gertrude Elizabeth Tyler (m. 1859)
- Children: Edith Kermit Carow
- Parent(s): Isaac Carow; Eliza Mowatt
- Relatives: Daniel Tyler (father-in-law); Theodore Roosevelt (son-in-law)

Charles Carow (October 4, 1825 – March 18, 1883) was an American merchant and shipowner who was the father of first lady of the United States Edith Carow Roosevelt.

== Early life ==
Carow was born on October 4, 1825. He was the youngest, and only surviving, son of shipping magnate Isaac Carow and the former Eliza Mowatt. His father was a former president of the Chamber of Commerce of the State of New York and was an incorporator of the Bank of Commerce in New York. His elder sister, Julia Carow, married English steel manufacturer Edward Fisher Sanderson, and was the grandmother of Henry Furniss, 1st Baron Sanderson.

His paternal grandparents were merchant Isaac Carow and Ann (née Cooper) Carow. His great-grandfather was Josué Quereau, a Huguenot who immigrated from France to New York before 1721.

== Career ==
His father moved to New York in 1793 and, later, partnered with Robert Kermit, owner of the Red Star Line, to form a shipping line. As Kermit had no children of his own, Charles and Robert developed an almost paternal relationship. Carow attended Columbia College with the class of 1844 but did not graduate. He was a member of the Peithologian Society.

After his father's death in 1850, Carow was taken into partnership with Kermit as Kermit & Carow, to carry on the business of general ship-owning, commission, and commercial trading. After Kermit died in 1855, Carow became the owner of The West Point until 1867 that shipped cargo and passengers between Liverpool and New York.

== Personal life ==
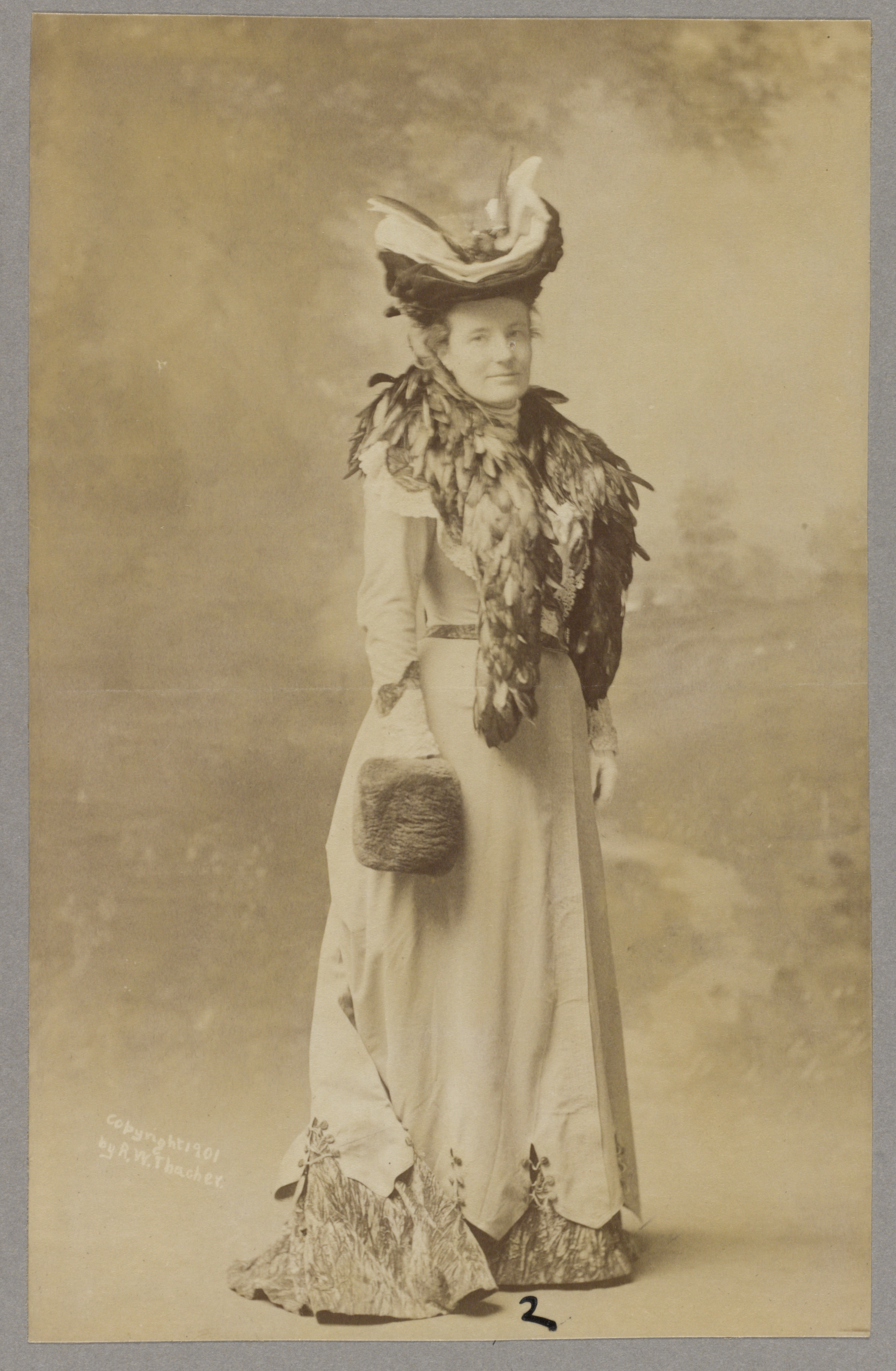
Picture of his daughter, Edith Kermit Roosevelt, 1901.

On June 8, 1859, Carow was married to Gertrude Elizabeth Tyler (1836–1896) at Norwich, Connecticut. Gertrude was a daughter of Emily (née Lee) Tyler and Daniel Tyler, a Union general in the American Civil War. While residents of Manhattan, the Carows were next door neighbors of Theodore Roosevelt Sr. on East 20th Street. Together they were the parents of three children:

- Robert Kermit Carow (1860–1860), who died in infancy.
- Edith Kermit Carow (1861–1948), who married U.S. President Theodore Roosevelt in 1886.
- Emily Tyler Carow (1865–1939), who died unmarried in Porto Maurizio, Italy.

Carow died in New York City on March 18, 1883. After a funeral at St. Mark's Church in-the-Bowery, he was buried in the church's graveyard. In 1927, his daughter Edith bought the Gen. Putnam Inn in Brooklyn, Connecticut, which was the ancestral home of the Tyler family.
