= West Point (1847) =

History

United States
- Name: West Point
- Owner: Robert Kermit, Kermit & Carow, Charles Carow Cie.
- Route: New York – Liverpool
- Builder: Westervelt & MacKay, New York
- Launched: 1847
- In service: 1847–1863
- Refit: November 1857
- Home port: New York City
- Fate: unknown

General characteristics
- Class & type: A, 1½
- Type: Full rigged vessel
- Tonnage: 1,046 tons
- Length: 166.5 ft (50.7 m)
- Beam: 37.1 ft (11.3 m)
- Height: 21 ft (6.4 m)
- Draft: 19 ft (5.8 m)
- Decks: 3 (initially 2)
- Notes: wooden ship (made out of southern live oak)

The West Point (sometimes Westpoint) was a full rigged vessel built in the 1840s and used for the transportation of goods, passengers and mail to and from Liverpool and New York. It was one of a few ocean-going packet-ships operated by the Robert Kermit Red Star Line company, not to be confused with the Belgian/US-American shipping company Red Star Line, whose main ports of call were New York City and Philadelphia in the United States and Antwerp in Belgium.

In 1846, Robert Kermit commissioned the shipbuilders Westervelt & MacKay from New York to build the West Point. Kermit's West Point was not the only ship to bear that name: it was overshadowed by the widely known steamship SS America, which was acquired by the US Navy on June 1, 1941, renamed to USS West Point and used as a troop transport during World War II.

== Construction ==
West Point was built in 1847 by Westervelt and MacKay, a company that acquired renown by constructing streamlined clipper ships and fast steamships. The shipyard also produced United States Navy ships such as the screw sloop USS Brooklyn.

West Point was built of southern live oak despite the fact use of iron had started to catch on in the building of ships – especially in the United Kingdom. In the following years, the advantages of iron ships became more obvious and the value of wooden ships decreased perceptibly. The owners of wooden ships therefore began to fasten their vessels with iron and copper. In case of West Point, this happened in November 1857.

== Property situation ==
=== Robert Kermit: The early years (1794–1834) ===
It was Robert Kermit who ordered the construction of West Point for his Red Star Line.

== Captains of the vessel West Point ==
Based on the remaining passenger lists, it was possible to determine that, within the 16 years the full-rigged sailing vessel West Point was in service, at least seven captains were the ship's masters. Listed below is a summary of all verifiable passages from Liverpool, with the arrival dates in New York City (assigned to the relative captains):

Number	Shipmaster	Liverpool-New York passages made under the command of the captain
1	William Henry Allen	October 25, 1847 – March 7, 1848 – July 3, 1848 – October 30, 1848 – Mai 26, 1849 – September 22, 1849 – February 13, 1850 – Mai 20, 1850 – September 2, 1850 – November 6, 1858 – August 8, 1859
2	Francis P. Allen	March 29, 1851 – July 26, 1851 – November 4, 1851 – February 12, 1852 – June 19, 1852 – September 24, 1852
3	William R. Mullins	March 6, 1849 – February 15, 1853 – August 15, 1853 – December 19, 1853 – Mai 19, 1854 – April 17, 1855 – August 11, 1855
4	William H. Harding	June 7, 1856 – October 30, 1856 – Mai 6, 1857 – December 7, 1857
5	J.E. Ryan	July 12, 1858
6	L.W. Spencer	September 17, 1860
7	J.H. Childs	March 16, 1861 – August 7, 1862 – September 23, 1863

== Literature ==
- MacBean, William M. (William Munro): Biographical register of Saint Andrew's society of the state of New York (1922)
- Scoville, Joseph Alfred (Barrett, Walter = pseud.): The old merchants of New York City (1863), ISBN 0-543-79000-2, ISBN 978-0-543-79000-2
- Lubbock, Basil: Western Ocean Packets, ISBN 0-486-25684-7, ISBN 978-0-486-25684-9
- Morris, Sylvia J.: Edith Kermit Carow Roosevelt: Portrait of a First Lady, ISBN 0-375-75768-6, ISBN 0-375-75768-6, ISBN 978-0-375-75768-6
- Whipple, A. B.: The Clipper Ships, ISBN 0-8094-2677-3, ISBN 978-0-8094-2677-5
- Laakso, Seija-Riitta: Across the Oceans (academic dissertation, University of Helsinki, Finland), ISBN 978-951-746-904-3, ISBN 952-10-3559-5
