= Robert Kermit Red Star Line =

Robert Kermits Red Star Line (Kermit Line)
- 1818–1835 1835–1867
- Type: Partnership
- Industry: Shipping, transportation
- Founded: 1818 in New York, United States
- Defunct: 1867
- Fate: Bankruptcy
- Area served: Transatlantic

In 1818 the Red Star Line (also known as Red Star Packet Line, New Line, and Second Line) was founded by Byrnes, Trimble & Co. from New York. (It should not be confused with the same-named Belgian/US-American shipping company Red Star Line, whose main ports of call were New York City and Philadelphia in the United States and Antwerp in Belgium). On September 11, 1835, the line was bought by Robert Kermit from New York, a ship-owner and agent for packet ships, and was renamed Robert Kermits Red Star Line (aka Kermit Line). In 1851 Robert Kermit took his brother-in-law Charles Carow into partnership as Kermit & Carow to carry on the business of general ship owning, commission and commercial trading. Robert Kermit died in 1855 and Carow assumed the business. In 1867 the Red Star Line went down.

== Establishment ==
In August 1817 Thomas S. Byrnes, George T. Trimble and Silas Wood established Byrnes, Trimble & Co. This was some years before the opening of the Erie Canal, when the chief supplies of breadstuffs for this market came from Pennsylvania and Virginia, and the firm, for some years engaged in the Chesapeake trade, was among the largest receivers of flour and grain from there. Silas Wood was by birth a New Yorker but he resided at the city of Fredericksburg upon the Rappahannock River to promote that part of the business. The partners also became owners and managers of several merchant ships, and in late 1818 established the Red Star Line of packet ships.

== Regularly scheduled sailings ==
The first line of regular packet ships between New York and Liverpool, the Black Ball Line was established in 1817 by Isaac Wright & Son (William), Jeremiah and Francis Thompson as well as Benjamin Marshall, and made semi-monthly sailings for Liverpool. The initial announcement of new competition for the Black Ball Line (now also called the Old Line) came in early January, 1822, from Byrnes, Trimble & Co. and their Red Star Line (aka New Line). Since the partners had been operating ordinary traders to Liverpool for a few years, they finally decided to start a regularly scheduled line traffic with four packet ships between New York and Liverpool: the Panthea, Meteor, Hercules and the Manhattan. The monthly service included sailings from New York on the 25th and from Liverpool on the 12th of each month. In 1823, the dates were changed to the 24th and 8th. Soon other South Street merchants launched competing lines to race against the Black Ball Line, and the Red Star Line finally was called the Second Line instead of the New Line.

In 1822, Messrs Fish, Grinnell & Co. began the Swallowtail Line, known as the “Fourth Line of Packets for New York,” their first ships being the Silas Richards, Napoleon, George and York, which soon moved to bi-weekly service. By 1825, vessels were advertised as leaving New York on the 8th and leaving Liverpool on the 24th of every month. Their actual schedules eventually varied, sometimes wildly, due to weather and other conditions. The names of the lines were somewhat confusing and mixed, as their organizations and owners changed during the years. The classification above is adequate for what has been used by Albion and Staff. Within the following years, new ships were added to the Red Star Line-fleet, for example the John Wells and John Jay which was replaced by England in 1834. The new vessels were not necessarily faster than the old ones, but they were certainly more attractive from the passenger's point of view.

Thomas S. Byrnes died in 1828, but the business was continued under the name Byrnes, Trimble & Co. until 1831. When Silas Wood returned to New York to take an active share in its management, the name became Wood & Trimble, and so continued until its final dissolution, September 11, 1835, after the sale of their shipping interest to Robert Kermit.

== Robert Kermit ==
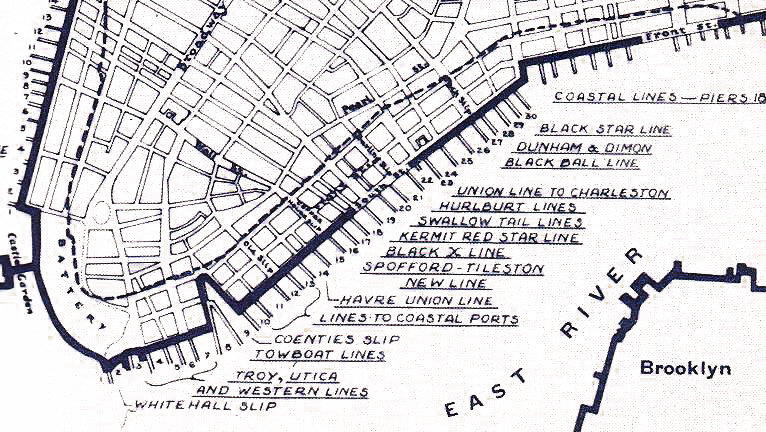
Map of the Port of New York on the south tip of Manhattan Island in 1851. Heavy broken line marks the waterfront below City Hall park in 1784. Area filled in prior to 1820. The docks of the Red Star Line are in the middle of the figure.

Robert Kermit, who gained a mercantile training in the shipping house of William Codman, and who went into own business in 1817, already owned the Saint Line in his earlier years, but was not successful. With the help of some wealthy backers, he finally took over the ownership of the Red Star Line in 1835.

Unlike other operators, Kermit owned shares in all the ships of the line, while the rest of them were mainly owned by various ship builders and ship captains. Under Kermit's management, several misadventures and shipwrecks occurred, but in the quality of the ships, and their speed and regularity, the performance of Red Star Line was still better than it had been before. A list of ships, that finally sailed under the flag of the Red Star Line: John R. Skeddy (1845), West Point, Constellation (1849), Underwriter (1850) and Waterloo. Other ships of Robert Kermits Red Star Line included John Wells, England, Empire, Virginian, Samuel Hicks, Stephen Whitney, United States as well as Sheffield.

In the pressure of hard competition, packet schedules were tightened when reorganizing sailings due to disasters, new launchings, etc. In 1844–1848, several ships made three-month round trips instead of the traditional four months, calculated from one Liverpool departure to the following one. West Point, Waterloo, and especially Virginian were among the fastest on the North Atlantic route. Virginian also was one of the most susceptible ships and often ended in reporting problems and misadventures.

For many years, Kermit operated the line in his own name (it was often called Kermit Line too) but since 1851 he was associated with his brother-in-law, Charles Carow. After Robert Kermit's death in 1855, Carow took over the business, but faced a disastrous drop in income and immense losses during the slump after the end of the American Civil War. Another reason for closing was simply that steamships had taken the business, first the mail service and the fine freight, and by the late 1860s, also the emigrant business. Red Star Line continued their service until 1867.

== Literature ==
- Albion, Robert Greenhalgh: Square-Riggers on Schedule. The New York Sailing Packets to England, France, and the Cotton Ports, Princeton 1938. ASIN B0006AO5QE
- Staff, Frank: The Transatlantic Mail, Massachusetts 1980. ISBN 978-0-88000-113-7
- Scoville, Joseph Alfred (Barrett, Walter = pseud.): The old merchants of New York City (1863), ISBN 0-543-79000-2, ISBN 978-0-543-79000-2
- Laakso, Seija-Riitta: Across the Oceans (academic dissertation, University of Helsinki, Finland), ISBN 978-951-746-904-3, ISBN 952-10-3559-5
- Morris, Sylvia J.: Edith Kermit Carow Roosevelt: Portrait of a First Lady, ISBN 0-375-75768-6, ISBN 0-375-75768-6, ISBN 978-0-375-75768-6
