= Edith Roosevelt =

First Lady of the United States from 1901 to 1909

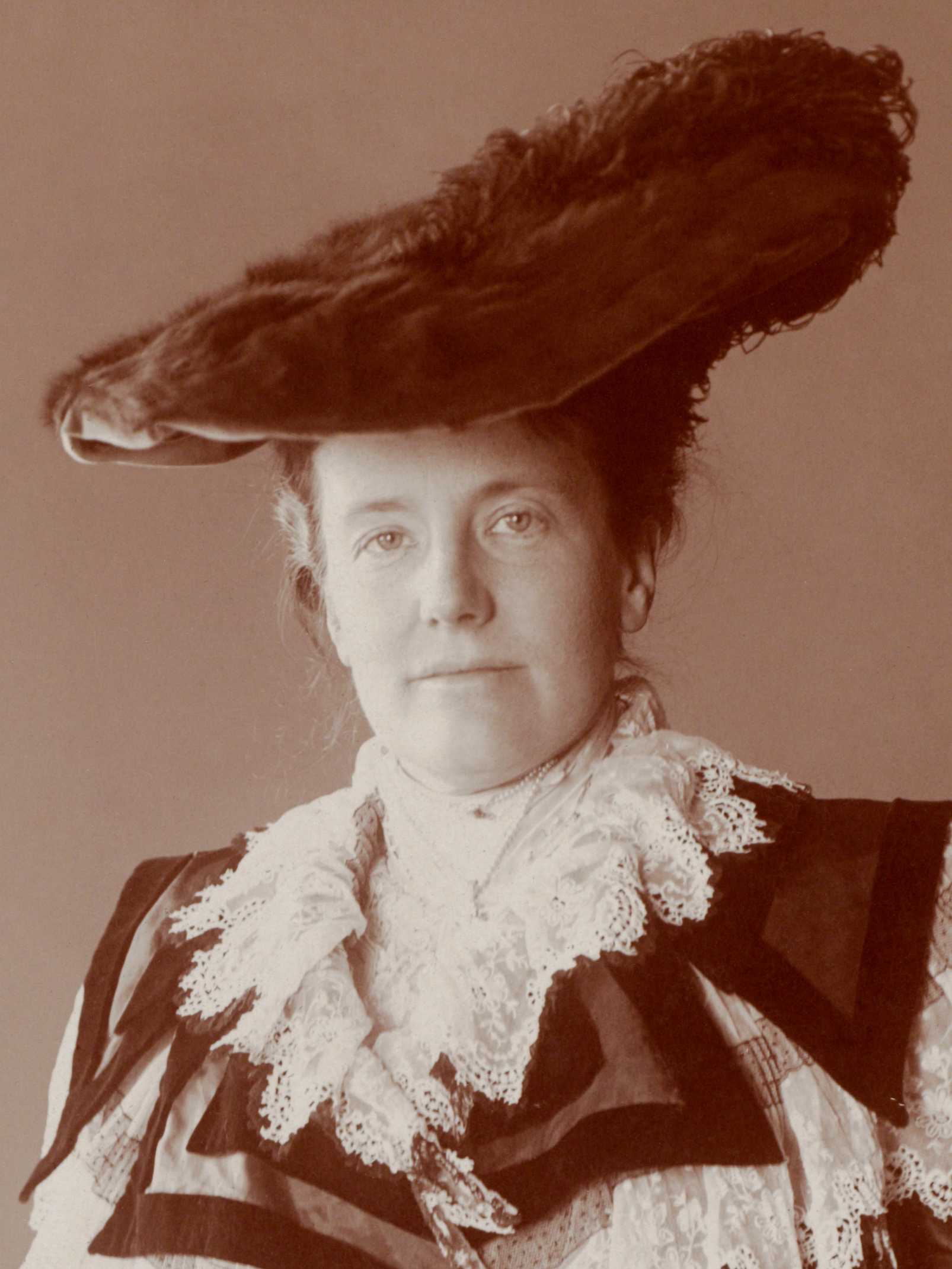
- Portrait, c. 1903

First Lady of the United States
- In role September 14, 1901 – March 4, 1909
- President: Theodore Roosevelt
- Preceded by: Ida Saxton McKinley
- Succeeded by: Helen Herron Taft

Second Lady of the United States
- In role March 4, 1901 – September 14, 1901
- Vice President: Theodore Roosevelt
- Preceded by: Jennie Tuttle Hobart
- Succeeded by: Cornelia Cole Fairbanks

First Lady of New York
- In role January 1, 1899 – December 31, 1900
- Governor: Theodore Roosevelt
- Preceded by: Lois Black
- Succeeded by: Linda Odell

Personal details
- Born: Edith Kermit Carow; August 6, 1861 Norwich, Connecticut, U.S.
- Died: September 30, 1948 (aged 87) Oyster Bay, New York, U.S.
- Resting place: Youngs Memorial Cemetery, Oyster Bay Cove, New York, U.S.
- Spouse: Theodore Roosevelt (m. 1886; died 1919)
- Children: Theodore III; Kermit; Ethel; Archibald; Quentin
- Parent: Charles Carow

Edith Kermit Roosevelt (née Carow; August 6, 1861 – September 30, 1948) was the second wife of President Theodore Roosevelt and the first lady of the United States from 1901 to 1909. She had previously been the second lady of the United States in 1901 and the first lady of New York from 1899 to 1900.

Edith Carow grew up alongside the Roosevelt family and married Theodore Roosevelt in 1886. They established a home in Sagamore Hill, where Edith had five children with Theodore, and they moved back and forth between New York and Washington, D.C., as Theodore's political career progressed over the following years. Edith became a public figure when her husband became a war hero in the Spanish–American War and was elected governor of New York. Theodore became vice president in March 1901, and she became second lady of the United States for six months; she became first lady when the assassination of President William McKinley propelled Theodore to the presidency in September of that year.

The exact nature of Edith's influence over Theodore's presidency is unknown, but they frequently spoke about politics and he often took her advice. She resented the press, feeling that it was intrusive. She leveraged her influence to control when and how they reported on the Roosevelts, and had professional photographs taken of the family so the press would not need to take their own. Edith also controlled Washington social life, organizing weekly meetings of the cabinet members' wives, and became the gatekeeper of who could attend formal events. Her oversight of the 1902 White House renovations and her hiring of the first social secretary for a first lady, Belle Hagner, are described by historians as her most enduring legacies.

Edith took up travel in the years after leaving the White House, frequently touring Europe and Latin America. Her health declined in the 1910s, and she was devastated by the deaths of her son Quentin in 1918 and then Theodore in 1919. She remained politically active, supporting Warren G. Harding in 1920 and Herbert Hoover in 1932. Edith took an interest in her ancestry in the 1920s, writing a book on her ancestors and purchasing her ancestral home in Brooklyn, Connecticut. She lost two more of her sons in the 1940s and was bedridden for the last year of her life. Edith died on September 30, 1948. Historians have consistently ranked her in the upper half of first ladies in periodic polling by the Siena College Research Institute.

== Early life ==
=== Childhood ===
Edith was born in Norwich, Connecticut. She was the first of two daughters born to Charles Carow and Gertrude Elizabeth Tyler. Though her family was wealthy, her father was an unsuccessful businessman as well as a chronic gambler and an alcoholic, while her mother was a hypochondriac. For much of her childhood, the family was forced to move in with various relatives. She was unhappy with her childhood, and she rarely spoke of her parents throughout her adult life.

The Carows were close friends with their neighbors, the Roosevelt family. Edith's early schooling took place at the Roosevelt home, as well as the Dodsworth School where she received etiquette instruction. Corinne Roosevelt was Edith's closest childhood friend, and Edith was often brought along with the Roosevelt children in their family activities. At age four, she stood with the Roosevelts on their balcony to watch Abraham Lincoln's funeral procession. Edith and Corinne formed their own literature club as children, the "Party of Renowned Eligibles", in which Edith served as club secretary each week for three years. She also bonded with Corinne's brother, Theodore Roosevelt, over their mutual love of literature. The Carows moved uptown in 1871, where Edith attended Miss Comstock's School. Here she developed a lifelong sense of strict religious morality. She also learned to speak fluent French and took a more active interest in English literature, with a particular focus on the works of William Shakespeare.

=== Adolescence and young adulthood ===
During the celebrations for the centennial of the United States in 1876, Edith visited the White House, afterward commenting that it would be unlikely that she should ever visit it again. After graduating from Miss Comstock's School in 1879, she participated in New York's social life, attending balls and making social calls. She was unable to travel, as she had to stay home tending for her parents, who had both fallen ill.

Edith and Theodore grew closer as teenagers, and they developed romantic feelings for one another. They stayed in contact when Theodore went to Harvard University, but they had a falling-out in August 1878. The details surrounding this stage of their relationship are not known. Various reasons have been proposed by the families and by historians for their split, including a rejected proposal, Theodore Roosevelt Sr.'s disapproval of Charles Carow's alcoholism, a rumor that the Roosevelts were afflicted with scrofula, or clashing personalities between their strong tempers. They rekindled their friendship in December 1879. By this time, Theodore was engaged to his first wife, Alice Hathaway Lee. This caused Edith grief, but she held a dinner in the couple's honor and attended their wedding. She maintained a close relationship with the Roosevelts over the following years, though she was cold toward Alice. Edith's father died from alcohol-related illness in 1883.

Theodore's wife and his mother Martha Bulloch Roosevelt both died in February 1884, so he moved west to distance himself from his life in New York. Edith did not see him for the following year. He avoided her intentionally, worrying that he would be betraying Alice if he developed feelings for Edith. When Theodore returned to New York in September 1885, he encountered Edith by chance at his sister's house. They renewed their relationship and were secretly engaged that November, unwilling to disclose that Theodore was to rewed so soon after the death of his wife. After their engagement was set, they separated for eight months so Edith could help her mother and sister move to Europe while Theodore could settle his business affairs on the frontier. They remained in contact, but she preserved only one of these letters.

Edith and her sister inherited an interest in a building on Stone Street in New York, and in 1886 they took the New York Elevated Railroad Company and the Manhattan Railway Company to court, alleging that the companies had caused damage to the building during rail construction. The trial went on until it was decided in the Carow sisters' favor in 1890.

== Marriage and family ==
=== Sagamore Hill ===
Edith and Theodore traveled to London, where they were wed at St George's, Hanover Square, on December 2, 1886. They spent their honeymoon in Europe over the winter, going to France and then visiting Edith's family at their new home in Italy before returning to England. The Roosevelts returned to New York in March 1887. They stayed with Theodore's sister Bamie for the next two months, then moved into Leeholm, the Oyster Bay house that Theodore had intended to live in with his first wife. The house was subsequently renamed Sagamore Hill. Edith promptly had her own family's furniture brought in to replace the furniture from Theodore's previous marriage. This was to be the Roosevelts' home for the rest of their lives. Edith decided that her stepdaughter Alice was to live with them and was to refer to Edith as her mother. Separating Alice from her aunt, who had previously been caring for her, began a lifelong enmity between Edith and her stepdaughter.

Sagamore Hill had a staff of approximately 12 servants, and Edith found herself managing the entire staff and estate by herself. Each morning, Edith tended to the household chores while Theodore worked on his writing, and then the two went walking or rowing in the afternoons. She was content with a quiet, domestic life, but she accepted that Theodore would often bring home company for her to entertain. To her displeasure, her husband was frequently away on trips west. She began suffering headaches that plagued her for the rest of her life, sometimes leaving her bedridden.

Edith's first child, Theodore III, was born September 13, 1887. She hired her own childhood nanny, Mary Ledwith, to care for the children. Edith then underwent a period of postpartum depression, and she experienced a miscarriage the following year.

Managing the family became a large responsibility, in part because she considered her husband to be one of the children for his involvement in their trouble-making, and she frequently hosted their family friend Cecil Spring Rice. In October 1888, Edith joined Theodore in traveling west to campaign for Benjamin Harrison in that year's presidential election, finding the experience enjoyable. After Harrison's victory, he repaid Theodore with a position on the Civil Service Commission. Edith was pregnant again, and she stayed at Sagamore Hill while Theodore moved to Washington, D.C. His absences especially took a toll on her while she was pregnant, causing her further depression. Edith's second son, Kermit, was born on October 10, 1889. She joined her husband in Washington that December.

=== Washington, D.C. ===
During her time in Washington, Edith took on more serious hosting responsibilities as the wife of a political figure, and she befriended several of the city's major figures, developing a particularly close friendship with Henry Adams. She preferred Washington to New York, and after arriving, she made her first of many visits to the Smithsonian Institution and Fischer's antique shop. She looked back fondly on these years later in life. She attended several receptions at the White House in 1890 with her husband, and was now received as a guest rather than a tourist. She retired to Sagamore Hill that summer at the end of the social season, and she accompanied Theodore on his travels west. While initially hesitant, she came to share her husband's love of the Badlands and Yellowstone.

Edith gave birth to a daughter, Ethel, on August 13, 1891. With a growing family and both their New York and Washington homes to maintain, the Roosevelts struggled financially. Edith was in charge of all the family's finances, keeping meticulous records and allotting $20 per day to her husband (equivalent to $720 in 2025). The increasingly erratic behavior of Theodore's alcoholic brother Elliott became the family's primary focus until his sudden death in 1894.

The Roosevelts were invited to dine at the White House for the first time on February 1, 1894, where Edith was seated directly next to President Grover Cleveland. Edith had another son, Archibald, on April 9, 1894. When Theodore considered running a campaign to be mayor of New York in 1894, Edith implored him not to because she preferred life in Washington and because he would have a smaller salary as mayor. He regretted not running to the point of depression, and Edith made a promise not to give further input on his political career. The promise was not kept for long.

=== Entering public life ===
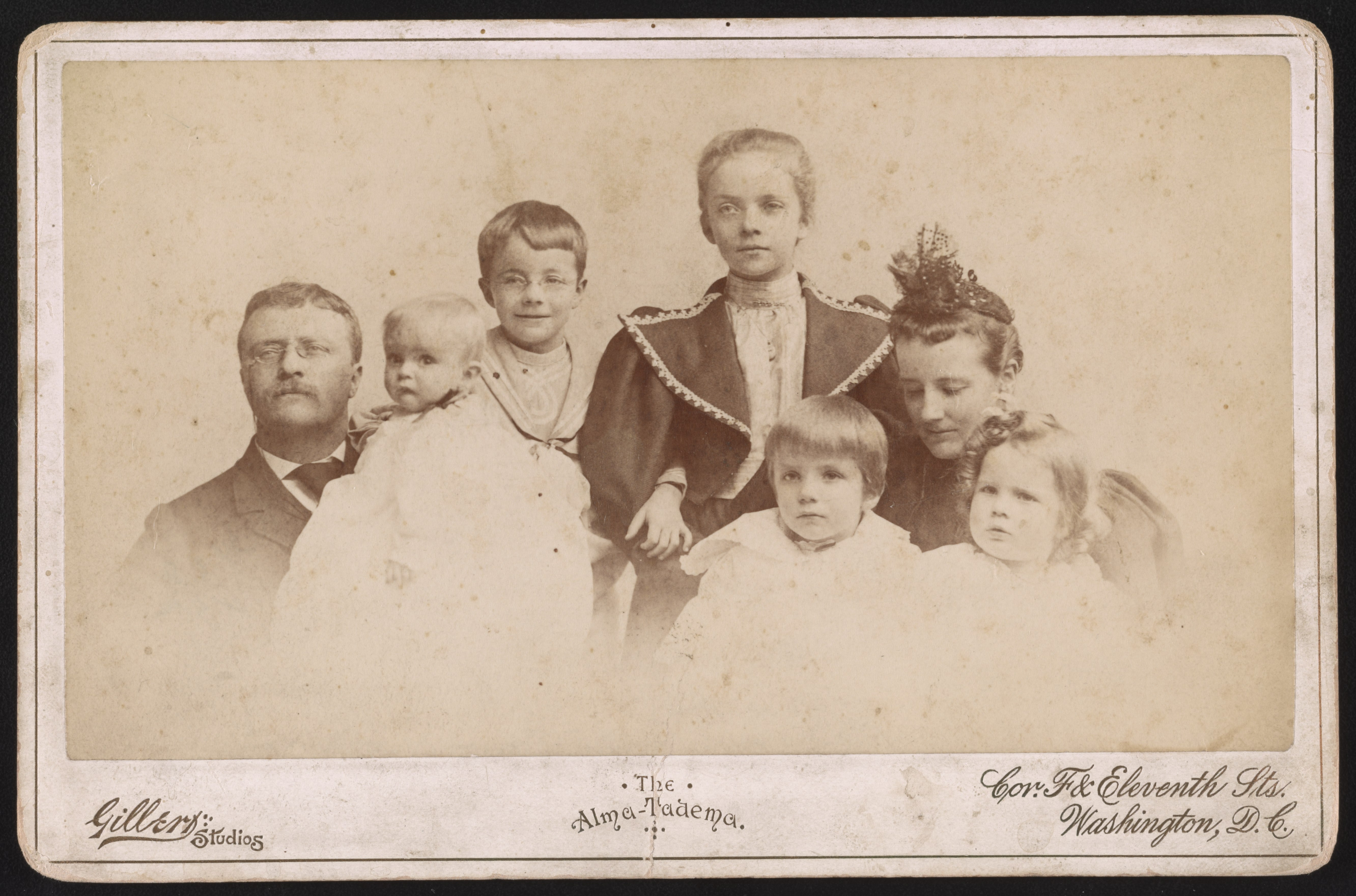
The Roosevelts in 1894

Theodore was appointed New York City Police Commissioner in 1895, and the Roosevelts again made New York their primary residence. Edith was reluctant to leave Washington and her social circle in the city, but the move also came with an increased salary for Theodore. Edith's mother died in April of the same year, and Edith's sister Emily came to live with the Roosevelts for several months. Theodore was rarely at home as he became heavily invested in his work. Edith eventually joined him in the city whenever he worked overnight, and after her period of mourning for her mother ended, she began attending cultural events in the city.

The Roosevelts returned to Washington in 1897 when Theodore was appointed Assistant Secretary of the Navy by the newly elected president William McKinley. Edith once again delayed her move to Washington because of pregnancy. Her final child, Quentin, was born on November 9, 1897. She spent the following four months recovering from an abdominal abscess and the resulting surgery.

With the onset of the Spanish–American War, Edith supported American efforts to end Spanish rule over Cuba. Though she was apprehensive about Theodore's desire to join the fighting, she defended his decision against critics. She traveled to Florida on June 1, 1898, to see Theodore off as he left to fight with the Rough Riders. Edith wrote to him almost every day while he was away and stayed informed through the newspaper, which often covered his exploits with the Rough Riders as he became increasingly famous. The Rough Riders returned to the United States that August and were put under quarantine in Montauk, New York, as disease had spread on the battlefield. Violating the quarantine, Edith and Theodore secretly reunited, and she worked tirelessly at the camp over the next four days as a Red Cross volunteer.

Theodore returned as a war hero, and their home became a place of public interest. When he began his campaign to be elected Governor of New York in the fall of 1898, Edith worried he would be targeted by anarchist assassins. She did not join him on the campaign, out of both her need to support the children and her desire to avoid public attention. She instead took charge of the mail that he received. Theodore went on to win the election, making Edith the first lady of New York.

== First lady of New York ==
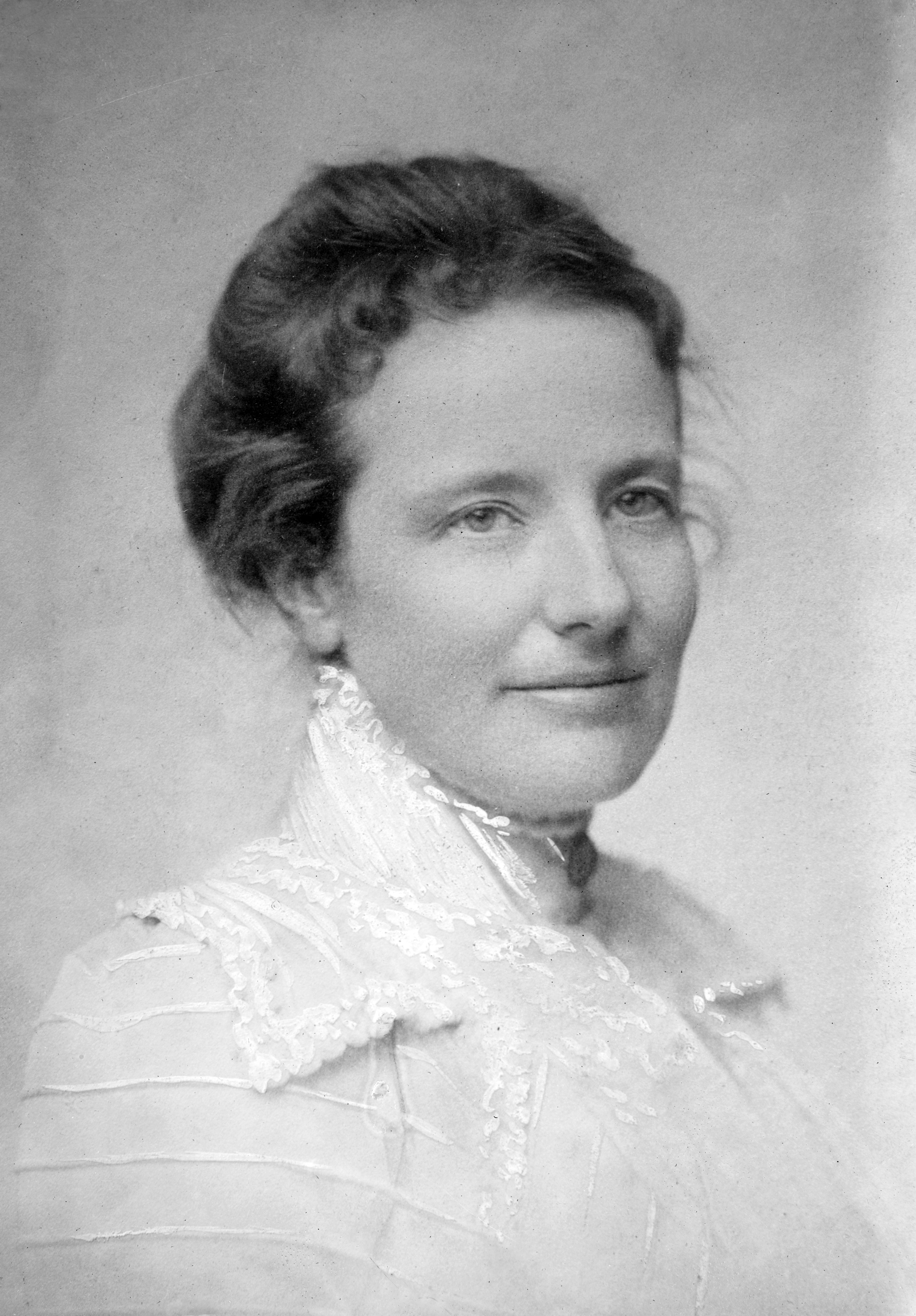
Edith Roosevelt in 1900

At the reception for Theodore's inauguration as governor, Edith held a bouquet in each hand so she would not have to shake hands with the thousands of visitors—a technique that she used throughout her husband's political career. Her children were older by this point, and their time in school or with a governess gave her a degree of freedom from her previous responsibilities. She renovated the New York State Executive Mansion in Albany after moving in so that it was a suitable home for her children, and she redecorated it with new artwork.

Edith grew comfortable with her life in Albany, as it brought financial security and her role as first lady allowed her to spend more time with her husband. She pursued new hobbies in the city, joining the Friday Morning Club and accompanying Frances Theodora Parsons on botanical trips. Edith was more cautious about public life as her husband became one of the most prominent figures in American politics. Her receptions and public activity were the subject of national press coverage, though it was generally positive. Edith's primary focus when entertaining was the flower arrangements, while an aide addressed food, seating, and music. In March 1900, Edith and her sister vacationed in Cuba where she visited San Juan Hill, the site of her husband's most famous battle.

As the 1900 presidential election approached, Theodore considered running for Vice President of the United States. Edith was uncomfortable with the proposition. It would again uproot the family's lives in a move to Washington, and it would come with a lower salary than the governorship. The two at one point drafted an official declination of the role saying he was needed as the governor of New York, but he attended the 1900 Republican National Convention and was chosen to join the Republican Party's electoral ticket. In the days leading up to the convention, the Roosevelts dined at the White House with President McKinley, where Edith reveled in the fact that she and Theodore were much younger than the other guests of their status. As the presidential campaign commenced, she tended to their home while he traveled to garner support. She became very thin during the campaign, because of the stress of Theodore being away and the possibility that he might win. After Theodore was elected vice president, Edith began receiving requests that she donate some of her possessions to be auctioned, as was common for prominent women of the time. She started a diary, deciding that her insights as the wife of a public figure were worth preserving.

== Second lady of the United States ==
Edith attended Theodore's inauguration as vice president in Washington on March 4, 1901. Edith and the children subsequently had lunch with President William McKinley, watched the inaugural parade, and returned to Sagamore Hill. Theodore joined the rest of the family soon after, as the vice president was not needed until the next Congressional session later in the year. Edith felt that the job's limited duties made it a poor fit for her perennially active husband. Nonetheless, she was glad to have more time with him. Over the following months, they attended the Pan-American Exposition, went horseback riding with Edith's new horse Yagenka, and endured a variety of medical ailments in the family.

In August 1901, Edith took her children on a vacation to the Adirondack Mountains while Theodore was on a speaking tour. It was here that she received a telephone call on September 6 from her husband informing her that President McKinley had been shot. Edith correctly speculated that the perpetrator was an anarchist. McKinley died on September 14, 1901. Only six months into his term as vice president, Theodore became president of the United States, and Edith became the nation's first lady.

== First lady of the United States ==
=== Becoming first lady ===
Edith dreaded the idea of Theodore being president, fearing both for his safety and for her children who would receive national attention. Only after leaving the White House did she realize how severely these anxieties affected her. Especially stressful were Theodore's absences on tours and hunting trips, during which she was in constant worry until his return. Edith feared that he would not do well under the confinement he would experience as president, and she worried that he was too young to be president. She received some relief at the beginning of her tenure when she spoke to former president Cleveland about Theodore as president, to which he simply responded "don't worry, he is all right".

Edith's first duty in her new role was to attend the funeral of William McKinley. Upon entering the White House, she rearranged the furniture in the living quarters and then promptly slept for two days. One benefit of their new position meant that the Roosevelts no longer had to worry about money, and she came to enjoy her life as first lady. For her sitting room, Edith used an oval library adjacent to the president's office. From here she could watch over him and scold him if he was working too late. Instead of overseeing meal preparation in the White House, Edith hired caterers, allowing her to lighten her schedule and to avoid potential criticism for poor catering decisions. She likewise delegated management of the staff to the chief usher. Rather than hiring a housekeeper, she took personal responsibility for the care of the mansion.

=== Life as first lady ===
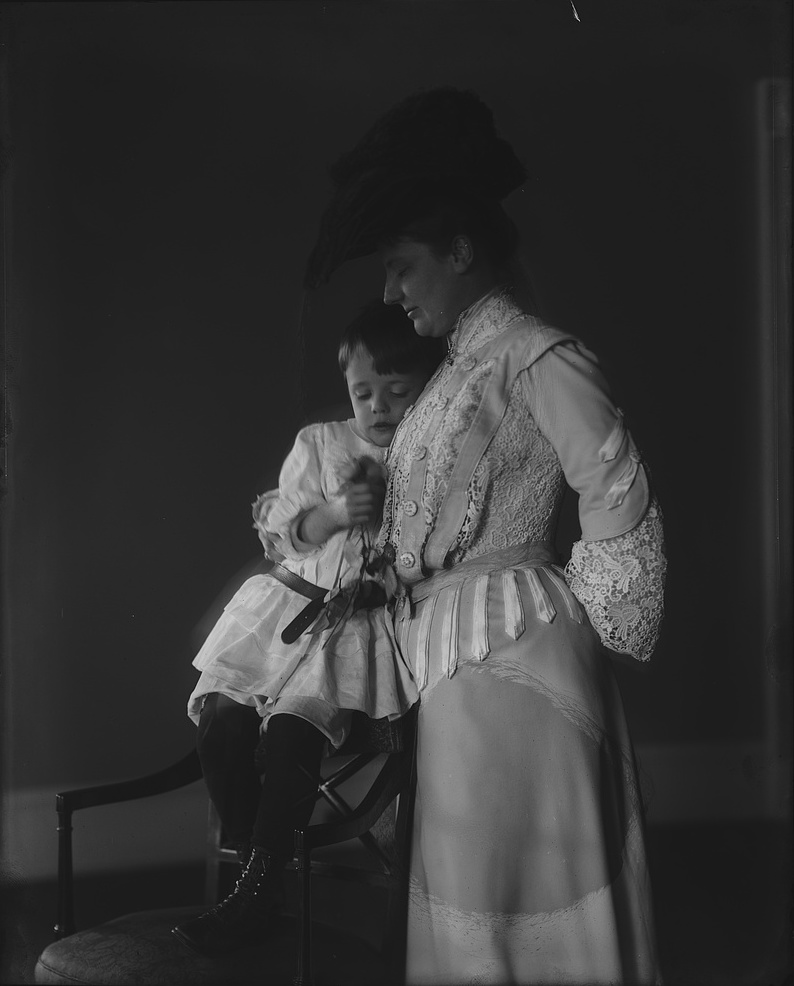
Edith Roosevelt and her son Quentin in 1902

Edith's mornings as first lady often entailed answering her mail, reading the newspaper, shopping, and studying French. In the evenings, she spent time with her children and went horseback riding with her husband. Despite the tribulations of White House life, Edith and Theodore adored one another and maintained a strong relationship. Each Tuesday, Edith organized a meeting with the wives of all the cabinet members to run concurrently with cabinet meetings. Here they planned and budgeted White House entertainment, and they made sure the wives' entertainment did not overshadow that of the White House. Here Edith also governed who was allowed on guest lists, excluding anyone that did not meet her moral standards, particularly those suspected of adultery.

In tandem with her responsibilities as first lady, Edith continued acting as the caregiver for her children. She tended to her children and her husband whenever they fell ill or were injured, which happened many times throughout her tenure. Quentin's childhood friend Earle Looker later wrote that Edith seemed to regret that her role as first lady prevented her from being more active in the children's play. She hoped for another child, but her two pregnancies in 1902 and 1903 both resulted in miscarriages. For two months beginning in April 1903, Theodore ventured off on a trip to the west. Edith cared for the children on her own at this time, first when she was on a cruise aboard the USS Mayflower and after she returned to the White House. Worried about his safety the entire time, she was relieved when he returned. Besides her own children, Edith also made sure to dedicate time to her stepdaughter Alice, who felt neglected by Theodore.

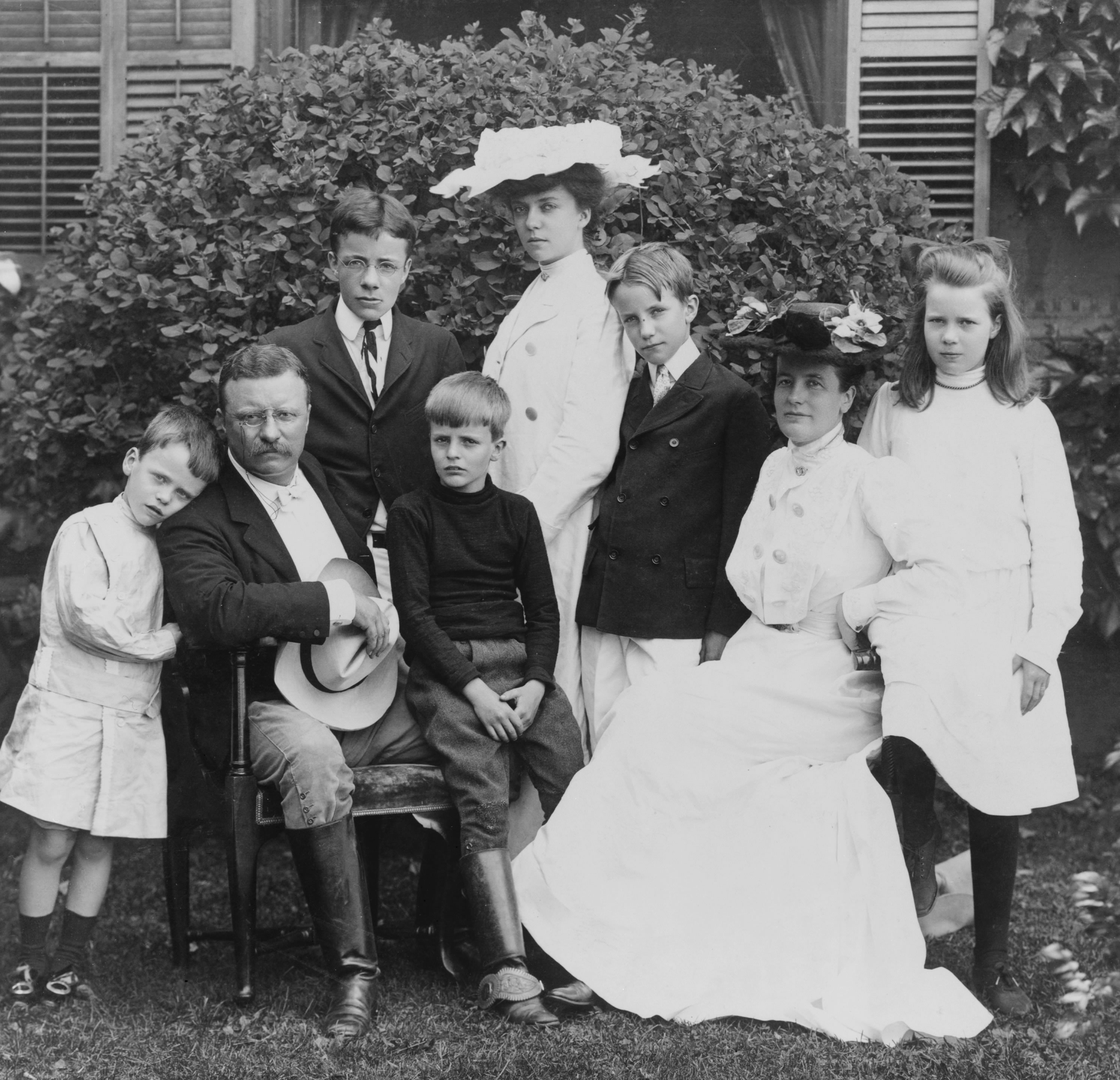
The Roosevelts in 1903 (left to right: Quentin, Theodore, Theodore III, Archibald, Alice, Kermit, Edith, and Ethel)

The White House became too hot in the summer, so the Roosevelts returned to Sagamore Hill each year. Edith was confident in Theodore's chances for his reelection in 1904, as she had a low estimation of his opponent, Alton B. Parker. She nonetheless lost five pounds from stress as the election neared. Edith was disappointed when, in the jubilation of his victory, Theodore announced that he would not run for election again. She knew he would come to regret the announcement, and she later said that she would have done anything in her power to prevent it if she had known what he was going to say.

In May 1905, Edith set off to create a presidential retreat to which the family could escape. Their home at Sagamore Hill was frequently visited by reporters, politicians, and those seeking favors of the president. She went to the Blue Ridge Mountains in Albemarle County, Virginia, where she purchased a cabin from a family friend. This cabin became Theodore's presidential retreat, Pine Knot. The same year, Edith joined Theodore in a voyage to Panama to oversee the construction of the Panama Canal. Theodore left for another trip across the United States in fall 1907, and she again grew anxious for his return, looking forward to each letter he sent. In the final ten months of her tenure as first lady, a series of attacks on unaccompanied women in Washington led Theodore to appoint a bodyguard for Edith's walks. He chose Archibald Butt, the new White House military aide. Butt accompanied Edith on her walks and shopping trips, and she felt herself able to speak freely to him in a way that she did not with most people.

=== White House hostess ===
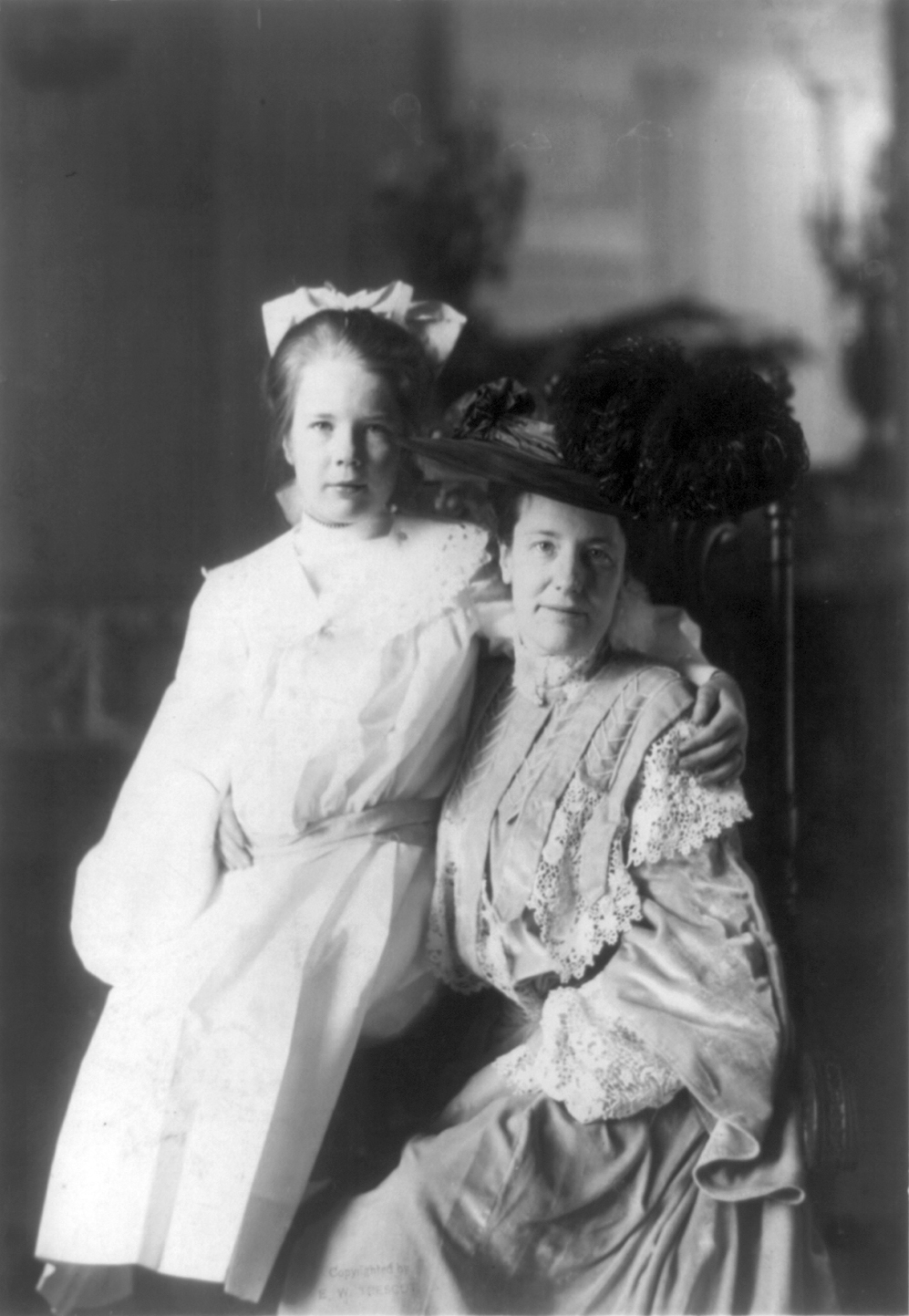
Edith Roosevelt and her daughter Ethel in 1904

The nation was in mourning when the Roosevelts entered the White House, so the first lady's traditional role of hosting social events was postponed for 30 days. As Washington became active, Edith increased the number of social events held by the White House each season, including dinners, teas, garden parties, and concerts. The 1902 social season saw approximately 40,000 people visit the White House, far more than any previous year.

Edith found comfort in the fact that the first lady did not have to make social calls, instead receiving them from others each afternoon. Being first lady came with new obligations that she disliked, including participation in large receiving lines and the White House Easter Egg Roll. She found the egg roll distasteful, saying that it ruined the grass and lamenting the smell of rotting eggs as the event went on. Though "first lady" had already become a common term for the president's wife, she never used the title herself, instead signing her name as Mrs. Roosevelt.

While the Roosevelts were staying in Oyster Bay in 1902, Grand Duke Boris Vladimirovich of Russia was touring the United States, and he engaged in what Edith considered to be vulgar behavior. She refused to recognize him socially, leaving to have lunch with relatives before he arrived to meet Theodore. Her rejection of the duke was praised by the press and by members of the Russian aristocracy.

The tone of the White House improved after Theodore's reelection, as the beginning of this term was a cause for celebration instead of the mourning that followed the assassination of President McKinley. This led up to Edith's most prominent social event as first lady, in which she hosted the White House wedding of her stepdaughter Alice to Congressman Nicholas Longworth on February 17, 1906.

=== White House renovations ===
Edith disliked the White House upon moving in, saying that it was "like living over the store". The building had become cramped with more employees as the scope of federal politics changed over the 19th century, and demand for workspace restricted the residential areas. Renovations began on the building in 1902, and the Roosevelts found other places to live for six months. While Theodore moved to a house on Lafayette Square, Edith returned to Sagamore Hill with the children. From here, she stayed updated on the renovations and prevented the implementation of any ideas she disliked. The work was carried out by McKim, Mead & White. The earliest point of contention was the location of the White House conservatory; the architect Charles Follen McKim wished to destroy it, and Edith protested. They settled on relocating it, an agreement that McKim dubbed the "Treaty of Oyster Bay". She also objected to McKim's proposed design for her writing desk, calling it "ugly and inconvenient".

Edith saw the construction of a feature long desired by past first ladies: separate living quarters secluded from the executive offices and public areas, allowing the family to live uninterrupted by visitors. This separation came with the establishment of the West Wing and the East Wing. Aware that extravagant spending could provoke controversy, she reduced costs wherever possible, having older furniture brought in rather than purchasing newer items. The largest change was in the East Room, which was entirely redesigned, including a new ceiling, wallpaper, carpeting, and three electric crystal chandeliers. She also had a tennis court installed, hoping that it would encourage her husband to maintain a healthy weight. Other projects included changes to the public areas and a redesign of the garden. The renovations were generally received positively. The Roosevelts moved back into the White House on November 4, 1902, as renovations finished over the following month.

After the State Dining Room was expanded to seat over one hundred guests, Edith purchased more china for the White House. Unable to find American-made china, she had Wedgwood china imported to the United States where it was painted with the great seal. She then ensured the continuation of the White House china collection that had been started by former first lady Caroline Harrison. Along with her social secretary Belle Hagner and the reporter Abby Gunn Baker, Edith tracked down much of the china used by previous administrations. At the end of her tenure, she had all of the damaged pieces destroyed, feeling that selling or gifting them would degrade the collection. She also organized the creation of a portrait gallery that featured official portraits of the first ladies. Since then, every first lady has had an official portrait created.

=== Political influence ===
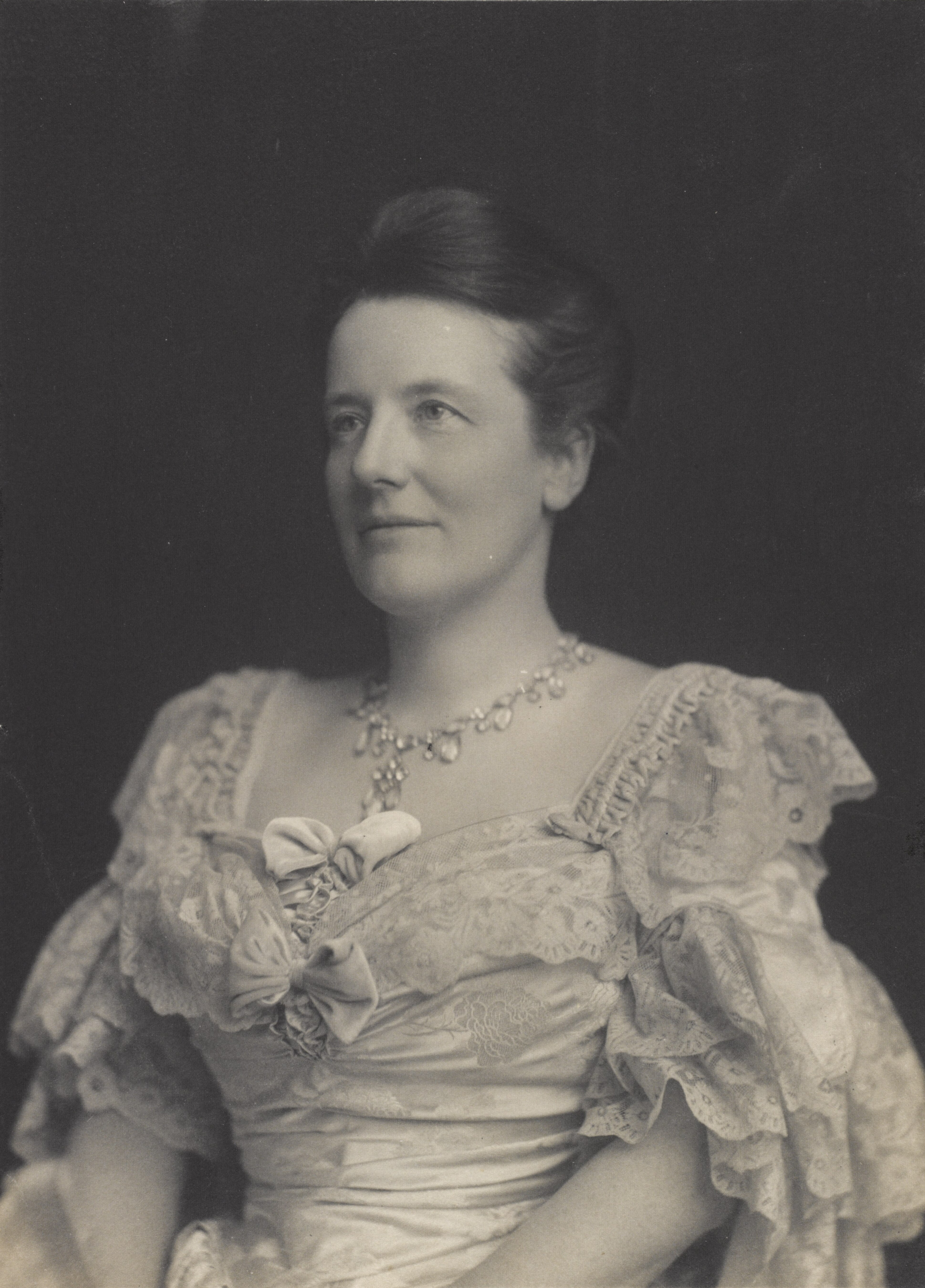
Edith Roosevelt in 1905

Edith did not share her political opinions publicly, but she often discussed them with her husband—a fact that was generally known by the public. Since Theodore did not read the newspapers, Edith read four each day and brought clippings to him if she thought they warranted his attention. It is unknown to what extent or in what areas Edith had political influence over her husband. One government official, Gifford Pinchot, said that she had "much more ... to do with government business than was commonly supposed" after Theodore appointed her preferred candidate, James Rudolph Garfield, to the Civil Service Commission. She sometimes worked with William Loeb Jr., the president's secretary, to convince Theodore of her ideas.

Edith often dissuaded Theodore from ideas she disliked. When he asked for reduced security, she instructed the Secret Service to ignore his request. She also had two Secret Service agents stationed at Pine Knot each night without telling Theodore. Edith had little interest in the political affairs of the Republican Party and its members, but she took an interest in certain political issues and gave her evaluations of the men with whom the Roosevelts interacted. She agreed with Theodore's policies when he became adamant about progressive reforms in his second term.

Shortly after becoming first lady, Edith put her efforts toward helping her friend Frances Metcalfe Wolcott reunite with her ex-husband following a divorce. Theodore wished to keep her ex-husband, former senator Edward O. Wolcott, from returning to the senate. This was in part because of political alliances, but Edith had a negative opinion of him for neglecting Frances that may have also played a role. The Roosevelts were successful in keeping Edward from being elected, but he never reunited with Frances. The Roosevelts later got Frances's son, Lyman M. Bass, a prominent position as a New York district attorney.

Edith often served as an intermediary for the Roosevelts' associates to get information to the president. During peace negotiations for the Russo-Japanese War in 1905, she was in contact with Cecil Spring Rice, who at this point was a diplomat at the British embassy in Russia. It would have been untoward for Spring Rice and Theodore to communicate directly given their respective positions, but Spring Rice wrote to Edith and his letters included valuable information for Theodore.

=== Charitable work and the arts ===
Edith donated handkerchiefs and other items to be auctioned for charity during the first two years of her tenure, establishing a "handkerchief bureau" to facilitate the donations. She stopped after the handkerchiefs were scrutinized and criticized, which caused her a great deal of emotional distress. She also made anonymous donations from her personal funds to those in need, so long as she could first confirm the facts to ensure she was not "'carrying' people when they should 'learn to walk'". Edith frequently did needlework for charity, participating in the St. Hilda Sewing Circle with Oyster Bay's Christ Episcopal Church. She voiced her support for the Audubon Society's efforts to end the use of decorative plumes on women's hats in 1905, and she joined the New York Assembly of Mothers in 1907.

Edith sponsored a variety of classical instrumentalists and singers, giving them a venue to perform at the White House. She enjoyed classical music, including the work of Richard Wagner. Edith hosted the famous German composer Engelbert Humperdinck when he visited the United States, which led to her appearance at a charity performance of Humperdinck's Hansel and Gretel for The Legal Aid Society. She also supported the theater and allowed the performance of plays at the White House at a time when actors were seen as lower class.

=== Press and public relations ===
Among Edith's greatest concerns with becoming first lady was the effect it would have on her privacy. This was something she valued, and she considered the press to be her greatest annoyance while living in the White House. She exerted her influence over journalists: for example, when she wore the same dress on multiple occasions, she convinced the reporters to describe it differently each time. To control media coverage of her family, she had photographs taken of herself and her children that were then given to the press.

It became common practice for well-off women to hire a secretary in the 1890s, but no first lady had ever done this. A few weeks into her tenure, Edith hired Belle Hagner as a social secretary, creating the first formalized staff office for the first lady. Hagner was responsible for answering Edith's mail, managing her schedule, overseeing guest lists, and communicating information about the first lady's activities to the press. In Theodore's second term, Congressman Thomas W. Hardwick objected to Hagner's employment on government funds and raised a motion to dismiss her. The remainder of the United States House of Representatives saw this as an affront against the first lady, and Hardwick was the lone voice in support of the motion.

Fashion was not important to Edith, who often kept outfits over multiple seasons. She sometimes had adjustments made to keep them updated. When Marion Graves Anthon Fish wrote a critical article about the first lady's fashion consisting of "three hundred dollars a year", Edith cut it from the newspaper and placed it in her scrapbook. The first published caricature of a first lady depicted Edith during her husband's dinner at the White House with Booker T. Washington.

=== Departure ===
Edith was skeptical when Theodore selected the secretary of war William Howard Taft as his successor to run as a candidate in the 1908 presidential election. This was complicated by the attempts of Taft's wife, Helen Herron Taft, to exert her own influence on the White House. Edith and Helen had developed a rivalry over the years, both distrusting each other and the other's husband. This contributed to a similar animosity between Theodore and William in the following years. The tone of the White House became melancholy when the 1909 social season began as the Roosevelts' presence there was nearing its end. The incoming Taft family, though generally well-liked, lacked the energetic reputation of the Roosevelts. Helen Taft had already begun planning the changes she would make in the staff. Edith had bonded with these people over the years and became emotional when discussing Taft's intentions.

While taking inventory of her belongings, Edith caused controversy because she intended to keep a $40 couch (equivalent to $1,400 in 2025) that had been purchased during White House renovations. After the backlash, she decided to leave it behind, saying that it was now tainted by negative associations with the scandal. Archibald Butt described this incident as the only time he ever saw her angry. Two years later, President Taft bought a new couch and had the original sent to her. As their time in the White House came to a close, Theodore grew excited about the prospect of a year-long African safari. This frightened Edith, especially when he said that he did not fear death during the expedition. The Roosevelts learned of the sudden death of their nephew Stewart Robinson shortly before leaving, and they spent these final days in mourning.

== Return to Sagamore Hill ==
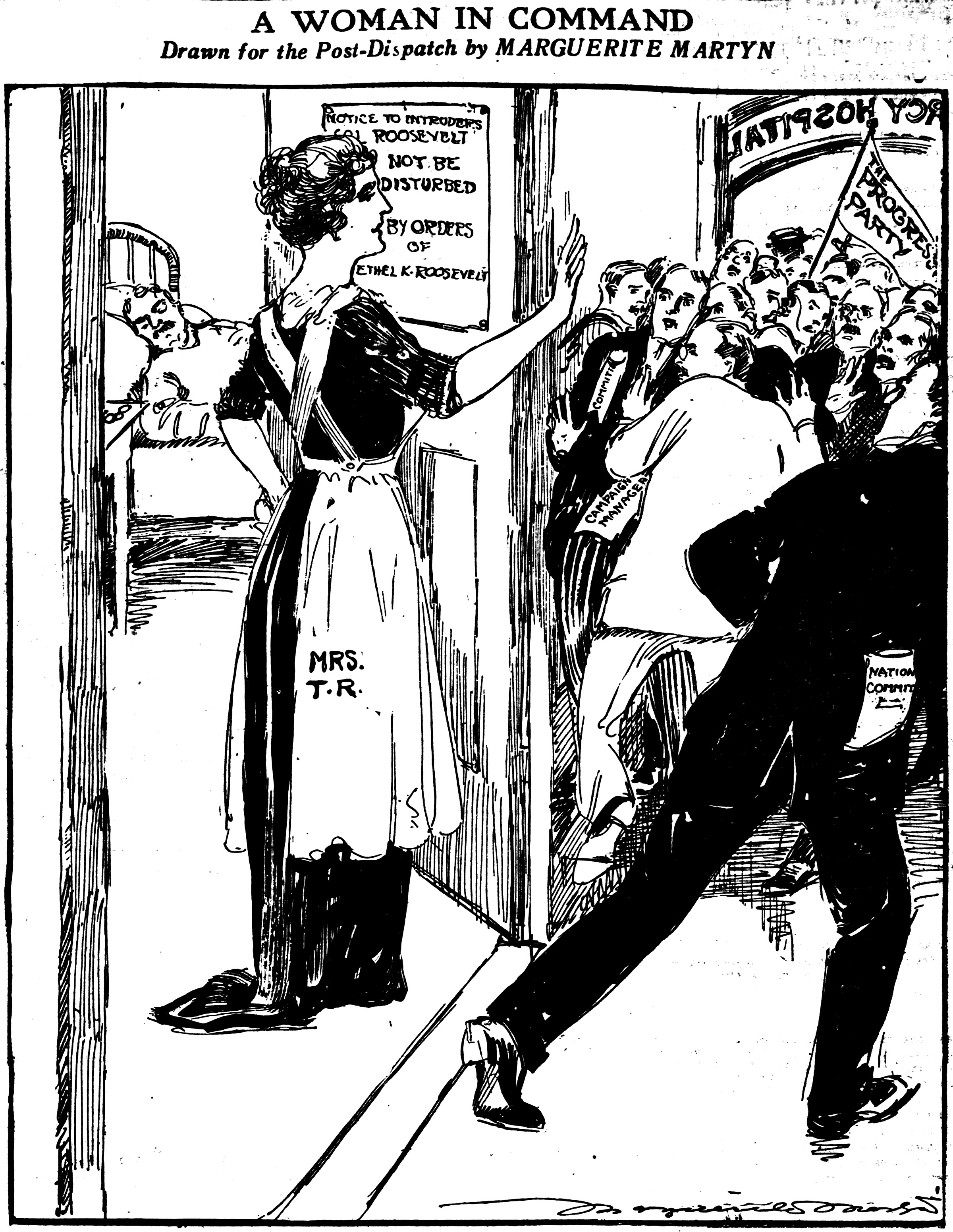
A 1912 cartoon of Edith restricting the public's access to Theodore after he was shot

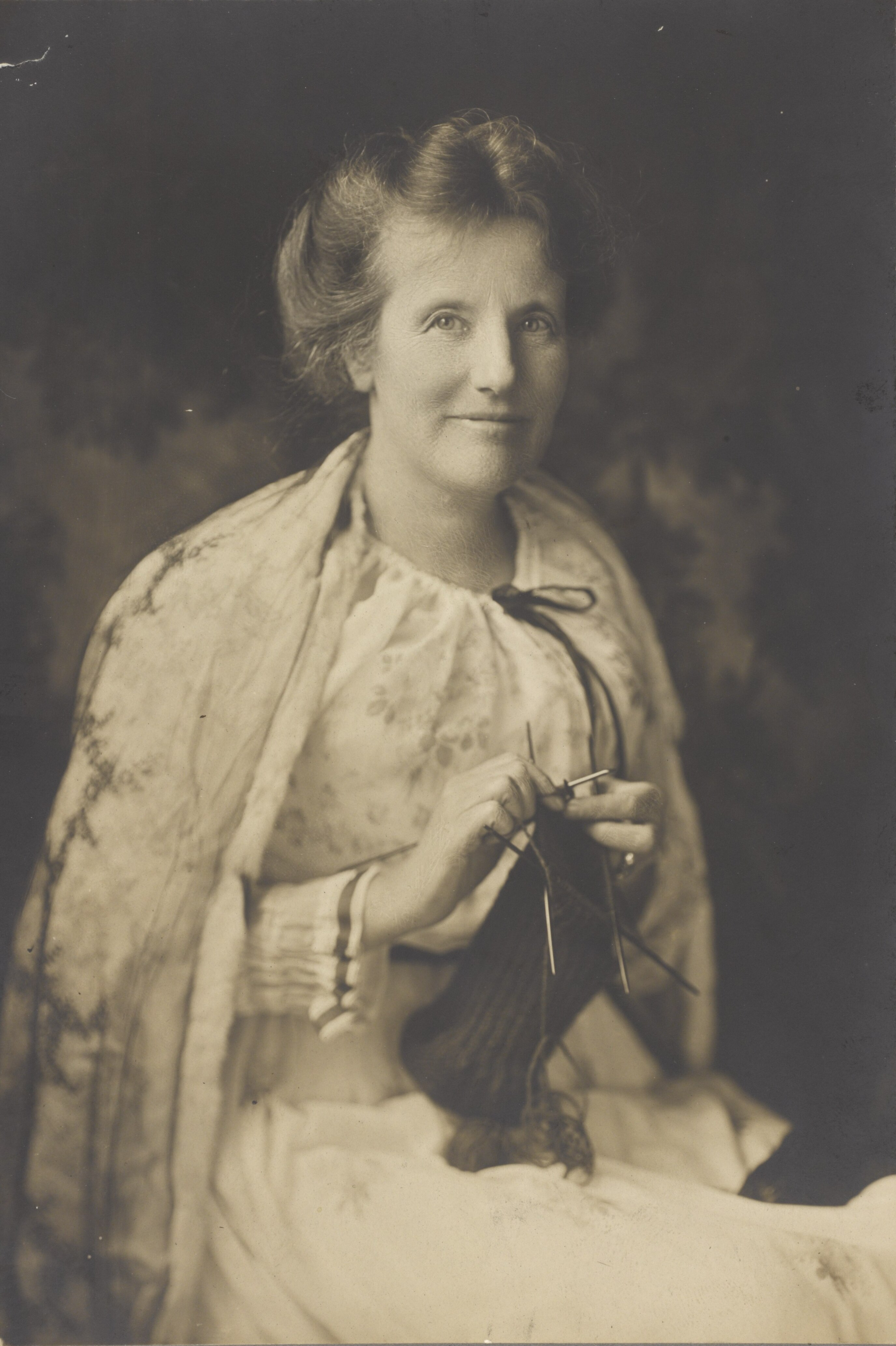
Edith Roosevelt in 1917

After leaving the White House in 1909, Edith returned to Sagamore Hill while Theodore and Kermit went on a safari. Her children had all moved out except for Ethel, who had just reached adulthood. The solitude became too much for Edith after a few months, so she took Ethel, Quentin, and Archibald on a trip to Europe, where they visited France, Switzerland, and Italy, including a stay at the home of Edith's sister. They returned in November, only for Edith and Ethel to leave for Egypt the following March to reunite with Theodore and go on another European tour. They returned to New York in June 1910, and for the first time in nearly two years, Edith, Theodore, and their children were all reunited. Theodore began embarking on speaking tours shortly after their return, again leaving Edith alone until she eventually decided to accompany him in March 1911.

With her life having settled and her children all grown, Edith found herself wishing for a grandchild. This wish came true on August 6, 1911, when Theodore III and his wife Eleanor Alexander had a daughter, Grace. Edith was severely injured the following month after being thrown off of her horse. She was unconscious for the next two days and underwent physical rehabilitation for several months thereafter. She temporarily lost her sense of taste from the accident, and she permanently lost her sense of smell. As she recovered, Edith and Ethel left for a weeks-long trip to the Caribbean in February, giving her a chance to get away as Theodore again became active politically.

Edith strongly disliked the idea of Theodore returning to politics. She advised him not to run for president in the 1912 election, asserting that he would "never be president again". When her attempts to discourage him failed, she assisted him in speech writing and accompanied him to the 1912 Progressive National Convention, though she did not campaign for him. Edith again feared for Theodore's safety as he resumed his political activity, and her fears were validated when he was shot by John Schrank while campaigning. Theodore lost the election, and Edith loathed the eventual winner, Woodrow Wilson, whom she considered a "vile and hypocritical charlatan".

In June 1913, Edith learned that her sister was to undergo an appendectomy and traveled to Italy to join her, staying until August. Theodore and Kermit went on another expedition later that year, this time to South America. Edith accompanied them in the beginning, returning home as they began the second stage of the trip charting unexplored areas in Brazil. Theodore's trek was dangerous and nearly fatal, leaving Edith worried until his return in May 1914. Her health declined that year, preventing her from attending Kermit's wedding. In April 1915, Edith underwent what was described as "a necessary operation".

As Theodore led the movement for United States involvement in World War I, Edith found that she no longer had the energy to keep up with political figures passing through their home. For her part, Edith marched with the "Independent Patriotic Women of America", which had been organized by Theodore III and his wife Eleanor. She also became president of the Needlework Guild. To get away from the politics of the war, Edith and Theodore left for the Caribbean in February 1916. They had planned further vacations over the following year, but as relations with Germany declined, the Roosevelts canceled them in anticipation of war. When the United States declared war, Edith encouraged her sons to fight. She took up typing to distract herself when they left for war, but this effort was short-lived. On July 17, 1918, Edith learned that Quentin's plane had been shot down and that he had been killed. To escape the reminders of Quentin at Sagamore Hill, Edith, Theodore, and Quentin's fiancée Flora Payne Whitney spent a month at Ethel's home in Dark Harbor, Maine.

== Widowhood ==
Theodore's health declined in 1918, and he was hospitalized on November 11. Edith stayed by him each day until his death on January 6, 1919. As was tradition for the widow, she stayed inside while the funeral took place two days later. Edith considered herself to have died with Theodore—something she told only her sister-in-law Corinne—but she felt that she had to do her part for the family and take on Theodore's family responsibilities as well. From February through May, she went to Europe to see her sons, stay with her sister, and visit Quentin's grave. She then accompanied Kermit on a vacation in South America that December. Both of these trips were fueled by a need to avoid memories of Theodore at Oyster Bay, but she began traveling for leisure as time passed. The following decade was marked by further ventures around the world.

Edith did not need the pension provided to first ladies, but she worried about embarrassing the other former first ladies by refusing it. She instead used the funds to support others, including former members of Theodore's Rough Riders. To maintain some control over Theodore's legacy, Edith also agreed to work with all of her husband's biographers, though she did not approve of all their work. She especially disliked the biography written by Henry F. Pringle for its portrayal of Theodore as immature.

When the 1920 presidential election approached, Edith campaigned for Republican Warren G. Harding. She made appeals to women specifically, as they had just been granted the right to vote. In January 1921, Edith traveled the Caribbean, including a voyage deep into the jungle of British Guiana with a party of six to see Kaieteur Falls. She joined Archibald on a trip to Europe in January 1922, where they visited Paris, Berlin, and then London, taking her first airplane trip to the latter. From Europe, she traveled on her own to South Africa. Edith hosted a party for Theodore's friends in 1922 in which they visited his grave and shared their memories of him, which became a yearly tradition. After hearing that her grandson Richard Derby Jr. had died in late 1922, she traveled to Pará, Brazil, the following January to distract herself. She traveled through Connecticut in April 1923, where she visited her ancestors' hometown Brooklyn, Connecticut. This inspired her to research her ancestry more thoroughly.

Edith and Kermit went on another trip in December 1923, going to California and then Hawaii before arriving in Japan the following January. The region had just been devastated by the Great Kantō earthquake, and tremors were still frequently occurring. They stayed at the newly constructed Imperial Hotel, which was designed to withstand earthquakes, but Edith feared for her safety as the tremors continued. She was delighted by the Noh drama performed in Japan, particularly Sumida-gawa, which told the story of a mother who lost her son. She had a much lower opinion of China and the Soviet Union as she passed through them.

== Further travel and political involvement ==
Theodore III was a candidate in the 1924 New York gubernatorial election. Franklin D. Roosevelt (Theodore's fifth cousin) and his wife Eleanor Roosevelt (Theodore's niece) lambasted Theodore III as they campaigned for his opponent, brewing resentment from Edith. That same year, Edith co-wrote a travelogue titled Cleared for Strange Ports with Kermit and his family. In 1925, Edith and Kermit published another book together, American Backlogs: The Story of Gertrude Tyler and Her Family, 1660–1860, detailing the history of Edith's ancestors in New England. The book was of interest to only a limited few and saw poor sales.

Edith traveled to Yucatán, Mexico, in early 1926 where she visited Chichen Itza. That year, she began featuring the poet Elbert Newton as a guest of honor in a poetry reading group that she hosted. The following year, Edith took a ferry across the Paraná River to the Iguazu Falls on the border between Argentina and Brazil. By this time, Edith was beginning to have heart murmurs, which she called her heart attacks. Knowing that her health would no longer let her travel frequently, she searched for a vacation home in the United States. She purchased Mortlake Manor in Brooklyn, Connecticut, which had been built for her great-grandfather, Daniel Tyler III. Around this time, Edith confessed to her daughter that after leading a happy life, she had only been happy twice since Theodore's death—both times in a dream. She took multiple trips to Mortlake Manor each year from then on, including an annual pilgrimage on July 4. Edith was not significantly affected by the Wall Street Crash of 1929 and the subsequent Great Depression. After Theodore III was appointed Governor of Puerto Rico, Edith went to stay there in January 1930 and again that December. She traveled to Jamaica the following March.

When Franklin D. Roosevelt was nominated as the Democratic candidate for the 1932 presidential election, Edith was frustrated by well-wishers who congratulated her, believing Franklin to be her son. Over 300 letters celebrating Franklin's nomination arrived at Sagamore Hill. She vocally proclaimed support for Franklin's opponent, Herbert Hoover, and began campaigning for him. To demonstrate her support, she took an airplane to the White House, visiting it for the first time since she was first lady. She did not recognize the interior, as it had been thoroughly refurnished, and she considered the whole experience "hateful". Franklin went on to win the election. Theodore III had been appointed Governor-General of the Philippines under the Hoover administration, and Edith traveled to visit him there shortly before the inauguration. Edith opposed Franklin's New Deal policies, insisting that they were nothing like Theodore's progressive platform. She argued that her husband “believed in shielding the individual from oppression and giving him freedom to development himself,” while those who sponsored the New Deal believed

in ordering the actions of the individual by mandate of the Federal Government. The schemes which they would have us consider as progressive embody the theories of government developed in various European countries, and are incompatible with our American democracy and liberty.

She maintained good relations with her niece-in-law Eleanor after the latter became first lady, and she generally approved of Eleanor's public activities.

== Later life and death ==
Edith's heart condition, diagnosed as paroxysmal tachycardia, left her in pain for hours at a time as it became more severe in the 1930s. She spent March 1934 in Greece before making her final journey to South America in January 1935. Her income at this point had decreased, and she could no longer afford elaborate vacations. Edith then broke her hip after taking a fall that November. It did not heal well, and she spent five months in the hospital. The injury meant she could no longer live an active life. Continuing her recovery in early 1937, she rented a home, Magnolia Manor, for a few months in St. Andrew's, Florida. She had not seen the house before renting it and discovered that it was a cockroach-infested house in a poor neighborhood, cast under shadow by moss-dripping trees.

Edith spent the early months of 1938 in Portugal, though she found the journey much more difficult in her old age. While she was in Haiti in early 1939, she received news that her sister was dying in Italy. The two had been almost estranged by that point, and Edith spent the rest of her life guilt-ridden, feeling that she had abandoned her sister. As she neared 80 years old in 1941, Edith felt greatly ashamed as she found herself no longer capable of managing her own finances and mail. Kermit's alcoholism became more severe in 1941, and he fatally shot himself on June 4, 1943. Edith had adored Kermit especially among her children, and no one told her that his death was a suicide. Theodore III died from a heart attack during World War II.

Edith was bedridden in early 1947, where she stayed for the remainder of her life. She died at the age of 87 on September 30, 1948, a day after she fell into a coma. She was buried next to her husband. Edith wished for a simple funeral, and by the time of her death she had recorded every detail of how to organize it. Her instructions were: "Simplest coffin possible. If the church has no pall, cover with one of my crepe shawls. Nothing on coffin but bunch of pink and blue flowers from my children. Processional Hymn No. 85 'The Son of God.' Not slow tempo. Recessional Hymn No. 226 'Love Divine.' The anthem from Beethoven's Ninth Symphony. Service as in Prayer Book. Do not take off my wedding ring and please no embalming." Her chosen epitaph read, "Everything she did was for the happiness of others."

== Legacy ==
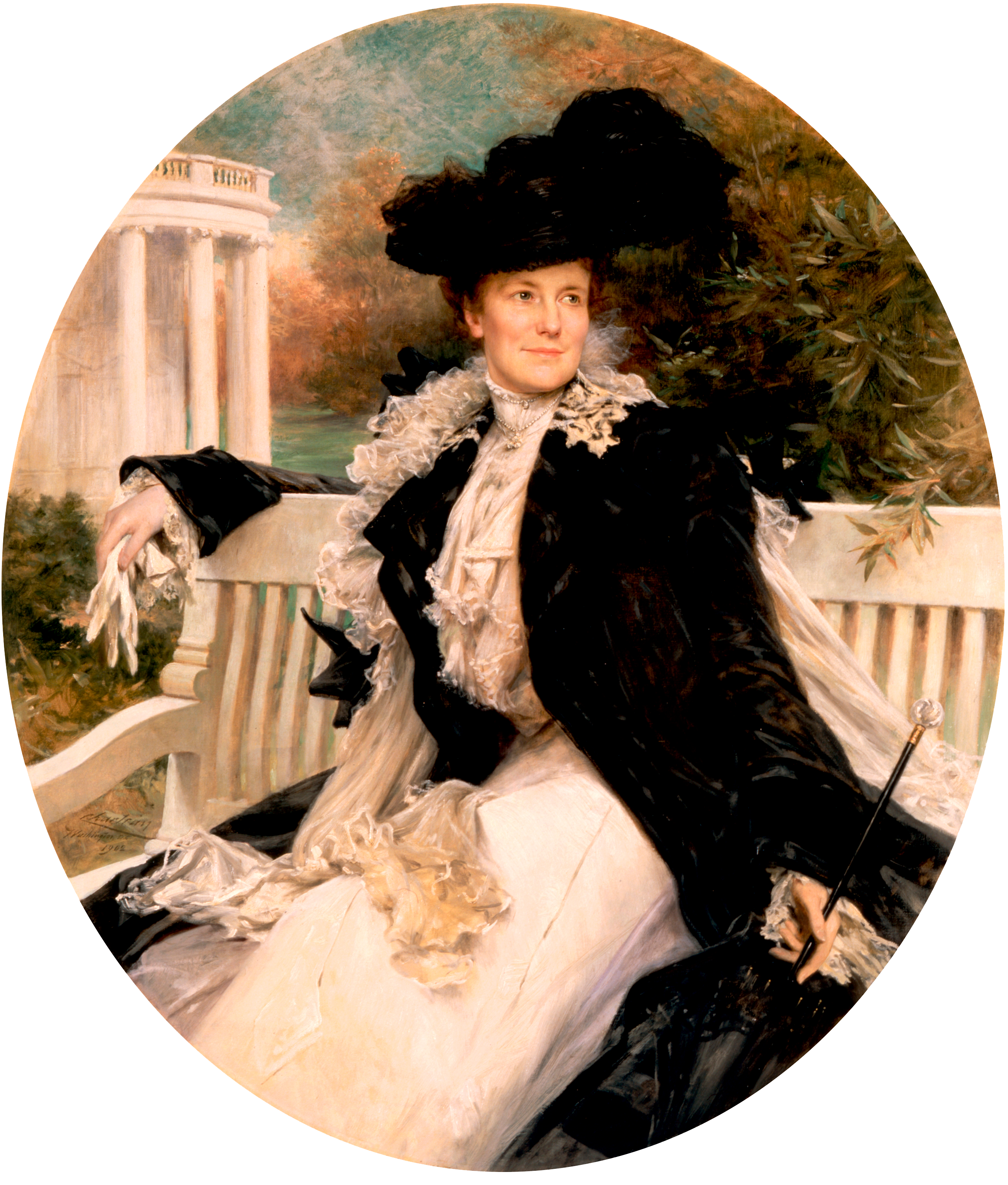
Official portrait

Edith was widely popular as first lady, maintaining strong public approval until her tenure ended. She was compared positively against her predecessor, Ida Saxton McKinley, whose poor health prevented her from being active as first lady. Edith was more socially active than the first ladies of the preceding two decades, as they either had abbreviated tenures or were unable to fulfill their duties. Besides social activity, Edith was the most athletic first lady to occupy the White House at that point, regularly engaging in walks and horseback riding. She was the last first lady to live in an environment where horseback riding was a common part of life, and she disliked using automobiles.

Edith is often recognized for the wisdom, both scholarly and political, that she provided her husband throughout his career. She read extensively throughout her life, preferring British, French, and German writers of the 19th century, including William Makepeace Thackeray and Jean Racine. Theodore once confessed his belief that she looked down on his literary knowledge, and he acknowledged that he was worse off whenever he did not take her advice.

Historians have little information about Edith's own state of mind while studying her life, as she avoided public comment and did not preserve her letters. She worried that her letters might some day be published, and she sometimes requested that recipients destroy them after reading. Surviving letters and other papers are kept in various archival collections, including those of the Harvard Library and the Library of Congress. Many of Edith's relatives and associates wrote memoirs that include detailed descriptions of their interactions. She was given little scholarly attention in the decades after her death. The first full biography about her, and the largest in scope, was Edith Kermit Roosevelt: Portrait of a First Lady, published by Sylvia Jukes Morris in 1980.

=== Historical evaluation ===
Historians credit Edith for developing the first lady's office as its own institution. The historian Catherine Forslund described Edith as the "first truly modern occupant of her post", citing her involvement in the White House renovations and her hiring of a secretary. The historian Stacy A. Cordery said that the White House renovations organized by Edith were one of her "most important legacies", and that her hiring of a secretary was "a significant innovation crucial to the creation of the modern institution of first ladies".

Historians disagree about Edith's views on race. Lewis L. Gould pointed to her use of racist language and the fact that she allowed racist songs to be performed at the White House to suggest strong anti-black views. Black people were specifically disallowed from her receptions, as was anyone of a lower social class. Gould presented a negative image of Edith overall, portraying her as having an "acidic personality" and casting doubt on her success as a mother. Deborah Davis contradicted Gould's account and said that Edith was an admirer of Booker T. Washington.

Since 1982, Siena College Research Institute has periodically conducted surveys asking historians to assess American first ladies, where Edith ranked:

- 10th of 42 in 1982
- 14th of 37 in 1993
- 9th of 38 in 2003
- 11th of 38 in 2008
- 13th of 39 in 2014
- 13th-best of 40 in 2020

== Notes ==
Honorary titles
Preceded by Lois Black	First Lady of New York; 1899–1900	Succeeded by Linda Odell
Vacant Title last held by Jennie Hobart	Second Lady of the United States; 1901	Vacant Title next held by Cornelia Fairbanks
Preceded by Ida McKinley	First Lady of the United States; 1901–1909	Succeeded by Helen Taft
