= Edward Hunter Ludlow =

American physician and real estate broker (1810–1884)

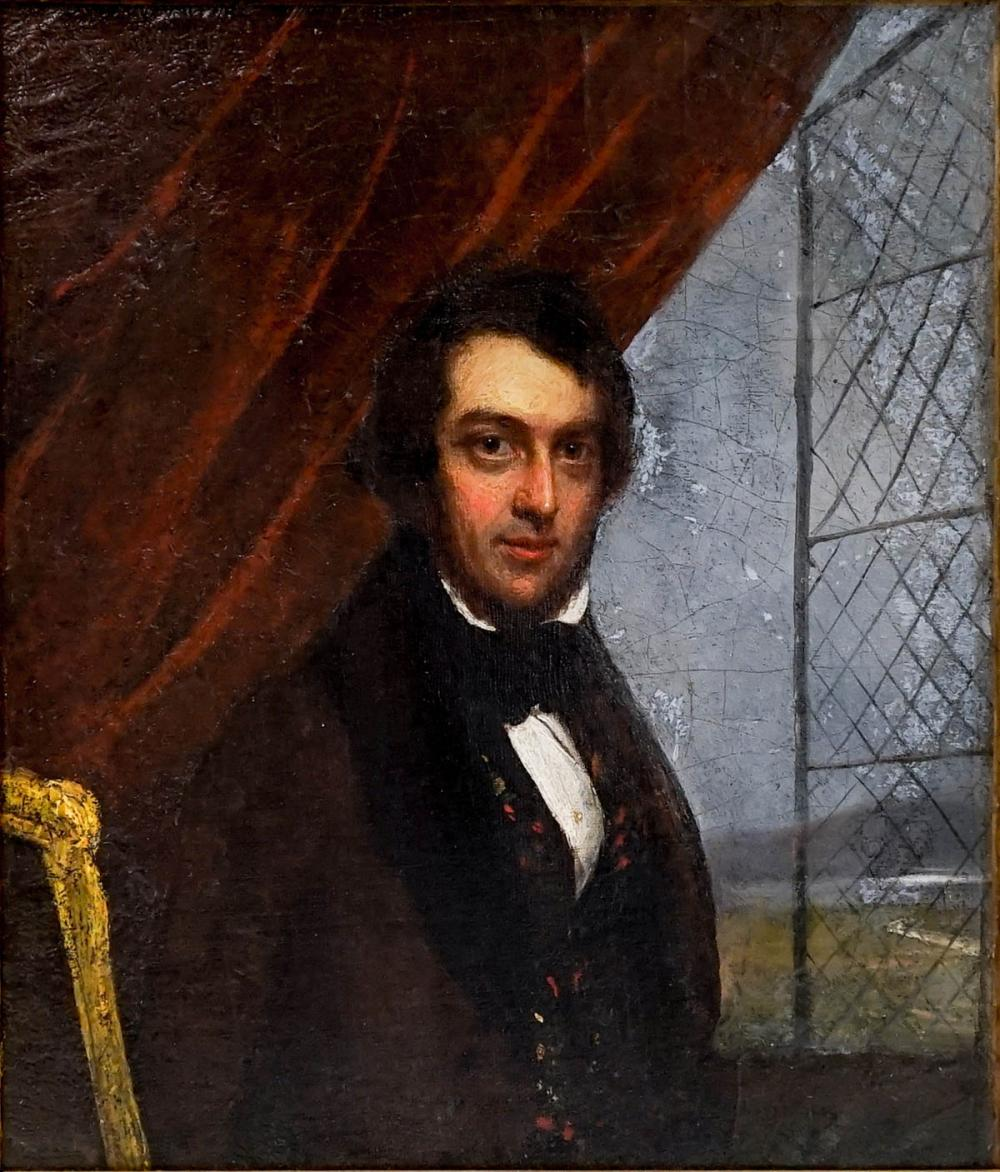
- portrait by William Page
- Born: 1810; Manhattan, New York, U.S.
- Died: November 27, 1884 (aged 73–74); Manhattan, New York, U.S.
- Education: College of Physicians and Surgeons
- Occupations: Physician, real estate broker
- Employer: E. H. Ludlow & Co.
- Spouse: Elizabeth Livingston (m. 1833)
- Children: 4
- Parent(s): Gabriel Verplanck Ludlow; Elizabeth A. Hunter Ludlow
- Relatives: Anna Hall Roosevelt (granddaughter); Valentine Hall III (grandson); Edward Ludlow Hall (grandson)

Edward Hunter Ludlow (1810 – November 27, 1884) was an American medical doctor and real estate broker. His granddaughter Anna Hall Roosevelt was the mother of First Lady of the United States Eleanor Roosevelt.

== Early life ==
A scion of a prominent Hudson River family, Ludlow was born in 1810 on Greenwich Street in New York City, which was a fashionable residential area at the time. He was a son of Gabriel Verplanck Ludlow, a lawyer who was at one time a Master-in-Chancery, and Elizabeth A. (née Hunter) Ludlow. Among his siblings was older brother Robert Henry Ludlow (who married Cornelia Le Roy) and Ann Eliza Gabriella Ludlow (wife of Horatio Gates Lewis).

His paternal grandparents were Gabriel George Ludlow and Anne (née Verplanck) Ludlow (sister of Gulian Verplanck, the Federalist Speaker of the New York State Assembly). His maternal grandparents were Robert Hunter and Ruth (née Brick) Hunter. His paternal grandfather was "one of the three Ludlows who were members of the Committee of One Hundred which was organized in 1775 to support the cause of the American patriots." The first Ludlow in America was Gabriel Ludlow, who settled in New Amsterdam in 1694 and became a prominent and influential merchant and a clerk of the New York General Assembly.

== Career ==
Ludlow studied medicine and duly received his degrees and diploma from the College of Physicians and Surgeons in 1831 before becoming a medical doctor. He later served as trustee of the Medical Department of Columbia College in 1872.

After practicing medicine for a few years, he turned to business, relinquishing his practice and in 1836 opening a real estate office at 11 Broad Street. In 1845, after accumulating significant wealth, he retired to his country estate near Tivoli-on-the-Hudson.

In 1850, however, he returned to New York and went into partnership with General Edward Jones Mallett (former Consul-General to Italy during the U.S. Civil War) until Mattlett's retirement in 1856. In 1856, Ludlow entered into a partnership with Morris Wilkins under the same name as the predecessor firm, E. H. Ludlow & Co., with principal offices located on Pine Street in lower Manhattan. The firm of auctioneers, real estate agents and brokers, which was the most prominent in New York City, offered to lease Edgewood, the former estate of Frederick Prime (youngest son of banker Nathaniel Prime) on the Long Island Sound.

Around early 1884, he took an active interest in forming the New York Real Estate Exchange and Auction Room, becoming its president and continuing as one of the "controlling spirits in that organization up to the time of his death."

== Personal life ==
In 1833, Ludlow was married to Elizabeth Livingston (1813–1896) in New York City. Elizabeth was the second daughter of Lt. Gov. of New York Edward Philip Livingston and his wife, Elizabeth Stevens Livingston (eldest daughter of Chancellor Robert R. Livingston and granddaughter of Continental Congressman John Stevens). The Ludlow country estate called "Pine Lawn" had a quarter mile front on the Hudson River. Situated next to Northwood (her brother Robert Edward Livingston's estate), Pine Lawn was the furthest north of the five subdivisions his father-in-law made to his children. Together, they were the parents of:

- Elizabeth Livingston Ludlow, who died young.
- Edward Philip Livingston Ludlow (1835–1915), who married Margaret Tonnelé Hall, daughter of Valentine Gill Hall and Susan (née Tonnelé) Hall, in 1863.
- Gabriel Augustus Ludlow (1838–1844), who died young.
- Mary "Molly" Livingston Ludlow (1843–1919), who married Margaret's brother Valentine Gill Hall Jr., a nephew of John Tonnelé Jr., the farmer and politician who was a member of the New Jersey State Legislature. Their country estate, a Second Empire-style mansion known as "The Oaks", was part of and just south of Ludlow's Pine Lawn estate.

After a period of feeble health, Ludlow died on November 27, 1884, at 21 East 24th Street, his residence in New York City. After a funeral conducted by the Rev. Dr. Charles Comfort Tiffany was held at the Zion Church at Madison Avenue and 38th Street, his remains were interred in the family vault at Tivoli.

=== Descendants ===
Through his son Edward, he was a grandfather of two: Susan Livingston Ludlow, who married Henry Parrish Jr. in 1884, and Edward Hunter Ludlow II, named after him.

Through his daughter Mary, he was a grandfather of seven, including: Anna Rebecca Hall (1863–1892), who married Elliott Roosevelt (brother of President Theodore Roosevelt); Valentine Hall III (1867–1934); and Edward Ludlow Hall (1872–1932). Through his granddaughter Anna, he was a great-grandfather of Gracie Hall Roosevelt and First Lady of the United States Eleanor Roosevelt, wife of her fifth cousin, Franklin D. Roosevelt.
