= Bamie Roosevelt =

Elder sister of Theodore Roosevelt (1855–1931)

Anna Roosevelt Cowles
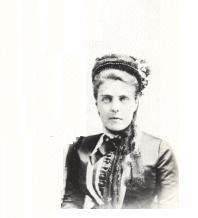
- Born: Anna Roosevelt; January 18, 1855; New York City, U.S.
- Died: August 25, 1931 (aged 76)
- Other names: Bamie Roosevelt Cowles, Bye
- Spouse: William Sheffield Cowles (m. 1895; died 1923)
- Children: William Sheffield Cowles Jr.
- Parent(s): Theodore Roosevelt Sr. Martha Bulloch Roosevelt
- Family: Roosevelt

Anna Roosevelt Cowles (January 18, 1855 – August 25, 1931) was the older sister of United States President Theodore Roosevelt (T.R.) and an aunt of First Lady Eleanor Roosevelt. Her childhood nickname was Bamie (/ˈbæmi/), a derivative of bambina (Italian for "baby girl"), but as an adult, her family began calling her Bye because of her tremendous on-the-go energy ("Hi, Bamie! Bye, Bamie!"). Throughout the life of her brother Theodore, she remained a constant source of emotional support and practical advice. On the death in childbirth of her sister-in-law Alice Hathaway Lee, Bamie assumed parental responsibility for T.R.'s daughter, Alice Lee Roosevelt, during her early years.

== Early life ==
Bamie was born in her family's brownstone home at 28 East 20th Street in Flatiron District, Manhattan, New York City on January 18, 1855. She was the eldest child of businessman/philanthropist Theodore "Thee" Roosevelt (1831–1878) and socialite Martha Stewart "Mittie" Bulloch (1835–1884). In addition to brother Theodore Jr. (1858–1919), Bamie's siblings were socialite Elliott Roosevelt (1860–1894) and writer/speaker Corinne Roosevelt (1861–1933). Bamie was afflicted by a spinal ailment (possibly polio or Pott's disease) that led to her being partially disabled and confined by corrective steel braces as a child.

Theodore Roosevelt's daughter Alice once remarked that had Bamie, with her incredible intelligence and energy, been born a 19th-century man, without the social restrictions that the era placed on women, she would have been president instead of her brother. She apparently reconsidered this notion, however, and clarified that "Auntie Bye was more like Mark Hanna, the maker of presidents, than presidential material herself." Her niece, Eleanor Roosevelt, stated in her autobiography that Bamie had "an able man's mind." Although she was not seen as a stunningly gorgeous woman like her mother or her sisters-in-law, her natural intelligence and energy were magnetic to both men and women. She remained an emotional pillar of strength for all the Roosevelts.

== Family responsibilities from a young age ==
Because Bamie's mother, Mittie, was often distracted by illness or by her busy social life, Bamie increasingly took a central role in running the Roosevelt household, particularly after the premature death of her father, Thee. In fact, T.R.'s elder daughter Alice remarked that Bamie almost seemed to have been born into middle age, so significant were the adult responsibilities put into her hands from childhood. Unlike many children in a similar situation, Bamie had the natural maturity, judgment, and wisdom to "hold the family together," Alice said.

When T.R.'s first wife Alice died suddenly following childbirth, most probably of kidney failure (Bright's Disease) or toxemia, Bamie took custody of young Alice. Because her grieving father initially would not call her by his late wife's name, Alice was called "Baby Lee" for her mother's family, the Lees of Boston. Alice would say of Bamie that she was the most influential person in her entire life. When the young and vivacious Alice became more than her stepmother, Edith Kermit Carow, or her father could handle, they would send her up to Auntie Bye for a dose of discipline and to give her the structure that the Roosevelts in the White House were not able to impose.

Elliott's wife, Anna Rebecca Hall, had wished for Bamie to have custody of her children, Eleanor, Elliott Jr., and Gracie Hall Roosevelt, upon her death. She was separated from her husband, and died young of diphtheria. Custody of the children was not immediately possible because Elliott was still alive—though exiled by the family because of his alcoholism—and could not be bypassed in the event of litigation. Bamie considered a custody suit but realized that Anna's mother, Mary Livingston Ludlow, would not be willing to give the children into Bamie's care. She did open her home to Eleanor, who was a welcome visitor and made extended stays. Bamie was successful, though, in getting Eleanor out of the oppressive and harrowing home situation by demanding that she be sent to Allenswood School for girls in England, where Eleanor developed socially and emotionally. During Eleanor and Alice's childhood, Bamie kept them informed of each other's activities, helping to maintain something of a relationship between the two, though it was a vexing relationship, ranging from sometimes being very close and often a bitter and competitive relationship. She was close to both girls and contributed greatly to their development.

== T.R.'s lifelong confidante ==
Throughout his life, Bamie's brother Theodore often turned to her for counsel in letters and personal conversations. In fact, it was said by their niece Eleanor that T.R. made few important significant political decisions and even fewer personal decisions without getting the input of his sister. She remained a trusted confidante for his entire career. As president, he would walk down to her residence at 18th and I in Washington so often that Bamie's house was sometimes called the "other White House." As she became more infirm, T.R. turned more and more to his daughter Alice for advice and to act as a go-between in delicate political situations.

== Marriage ==
In 1895 at age 40, Anna Roosevelt married US Navy Lt. Commander (later Rear Admiral) William Sheffield Cowles (1846–1923), a divorcé who was 49. They had a son, William Jr. (1898–1986), who married Margaret Alwyn Krech (1900–1982) in 1920.

== Later life ==
When niece Eleanor Roosevelt campaigned against T.R.'s eldest son, Theodore "Ted" Roosevelt III, she publicly broke with her niece after the ordeal. In a letter to her son, Bamie wrote of Eleanor:

"I just hate to see Eleanor let herself look as she does. Though never handsome, she always had to me a charming effect. Alas and alack, ever since politics have become her choicest interest, all her charm has disappeared!"

T.R.'s elder daughter Alice also broke with Eleanor over this highly distasteful (to Theodore's family) political activity that included Eleanor's riding up to Ted's speaking engagements with a teapot on her car to remind voters of Ted's supposed (but later disproved) connections to the Teapot Dome Scandal. Eleanor dismissed Bamie's criticisms by referring to her as an "aged woman." Despite all these intra-family discords, long after Bamie's death, Alice and Eleanor would later reconcile after Eleanor wrote Alice a comforting letter upon the death of Alice's daughter, Paulina Longworth.

== Eleanor Roosevelt on her Aunt Bamie ==
Bamie and her niece, Eleanor Roosevelt, eventually reconciled, and in an article in the Ladies Home Journal, "How to Take Criticism," Eleanor referred to her Aunt Bamie, saying, "I can honestly say that I hate no one, and perhaps the best advice I can give to anyone who suffers from criticism and yet must be in the public eye, would be contained in the words of my aunt, Mrs. William Sheffield Cowles. She was President Theodore Roosevelt's sister and the aunt to whom many of the young people in the family went for advice. I had asked her whether I should do something which at that time would have caused a great deal of criticism, and her answer was: 'Do not be bothered by what people say as long as you are sure that you are doing what seems right to you, but be sure that you face yourself honestly.'"

== Death ==
Anna Roosevelt Cowles died on August 25, 1931, in Farmington, Connecticut, aged 76.

== Sources ==
=== Primary sources ===
- Roosevelt, Theodore. An Autobiography. (1913)

=== Secondary sources ===
- Beale Howard K. Theodore Roosevelt and the Rise of America to World Power (1956).
- Brands, H.W. Theodore Roosevelt (2001)
- Caroli, Betty Boyd. The Roosevelt Women, Basic Books (1998)
- Dalton, Kathleen. Theodore Roosevelt: A Strenuous Life. (2002)
- Harbaugh, William Henry. The Life and Times of Theodore Roosevelt. (1963)
- McCullough, David. Mornings on Horseback: The Story of an Extraordinary Family, a Vanished Way of Life, and the Unique Child Who Became Theodore Roosevelt (2001)
- Morris, Edmund The Rise of Theodore Roosevelt (1979)
- Morris, Edmund Theodore Rex. (2001)
- Mowry, George. The era of Theodore Roosevelt and the birth of modern America, 1900-1912. (1954)
