= Valentine Hall Jr. =

American socialite, banker and merchant (1834–1880)

- Born: Valentine Gill Hall Jr. March 27, 1834; New York City, U.S.
- Died: July 17, 1880 (aged 46); Tivoli, New York, U.S.
- Spouse: Mary Livingston Ludlow (m. 1861)
- Children: 7, including Anna, Valentine, Edward
- Relatives: Eleanor Roosevelt (granddaughter); Hall Roosevelt (grandson); John Tonnelé (uncle)

Valentine Gill Hall Jr. (March 27, 1834 – July 17, 1880) was an American socialite, banker, and merchant who was the maternal grandfather of First Lady Eleanor Roosevelt.

== Early life ==
Hall was born in New York City on March 27, 1834, to Valentine Gill Hall Sr. and Susan Hall, née Tonnelé. His younger sister, Margaret Tonnelé Hall, was married to Edward Philip Livingston Ludlow, the older brother of his wife, two years after his marriage in 1861. Another sister, Catherine Tonnelé Hall, was married to Eugene Schieffelin, and a brother, John Tonnelé Hall, was married to Catherine Cruger Delafield, daughter of Rufus King Delafield, and niece of merchants Richard Delafield and Edward Delafield.

His maternal grandparents were Rebecca (née Waterbury) Tonnelé, and John Tonnelé Sr, a Frenchman. His uncle was John Tonnelé Jr., the farmer and politician who was a member of the New Jersey State Legislature, and his grandmother Rebecca was the daughter of Revolutionary War General David How Waterbury, Jr.

== Career ==
His father and his maternal grandfather were business partners in the New York City wool merchant firm of Tonnelé & Hall, who were considered "the most extensive Wool dealers in the country" in 1842. Through their firm, Hall's father was able to build a large fortune, estimated at $250,000 in 1842, which included "considerable holdings in New York City real estate," from 14th to 18th Street along Sixth Avenue. After his grandfather retired, his uncle, John Tonnelé Jr. ran the business with his father, who retired in 1845 before age 50. Together, his uncle John and grandfather were worth $1,000,000 in 1842.

Hall himself did not go into business but "lived the life of a leisured gentleman." He was a man of solemn dignity who attended theology school as a purported act of penitence for his youthful "sowing of wild oats." He devoted himself and his energy to religious study and became rather puritanical.

== Personal life ==
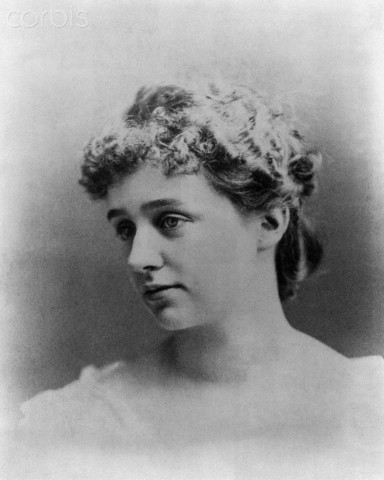
Hall's eldest daughter, Anna Hall Roosevelt

On April 24, 1861, Hall was married to Mary Livingston "Molly" Ludlow in a marriage that "...united a member of a prominent New York merchantile family with Hudson River gentry". Mary was the daughter of Dr. Edward Hunter Ludlow, another business partner of Hall's father, and Elizabeth (née Livingston) Ludlow, the granddaughter of the 11th Lieutenant Governor of New York, Edward Philip Livingston, and the great-granddaughter of Chancellor Robert Livingston, of the Livingston family. After the death of her parents, Valentine brought the family to live at the Ludlow home in Clermont, New York (five miles north of Tivoli), building a Second Empire-style 8,375-square-foot mansion called Oak Terrace on Woods Road (also known as "The Oaks" or "Oak Lawn") in 1872 next to the house of his brother-in-law, which overlooks the Hudson River and the Catskill Mountains. Together, Valentine and Mary were the parents of seven children:

- Anna Rebecca Hall (1863–1892), who married Elliott Roosevelt (1860–1894), the son of Theodore Roosevelt Sr. and brother of U.S. president Theodore Roosevelt, in 1883.
- Elizabeth Livingston Hall (1865–1944), who married Stanley Mortimer (1855–1932), son of William Yates Mortimer and Elizabeth (née Thorpe) Mortimer and brother of Richard Mortimer, in 1890.
- Valentine Gill Hall III (1867–1934), a champion tennis player.
- Mary Livingston Hall (1869–1872), who died young.
- Edward Ludlow Hall (1872–1932), also a champion tennis player, who married Josephine Booraen Zabriskie (1878–1912), daughter of Augustus Zabriskie, in 1898.
- Edith Livingston Hall (1873–1920), who married William Forbes Morgan, Jr. (b. 1877), son of William Forbes Morgan and Ellie (née Robinson) Morgan, in 1904.
- Maude Livingston Hall (1877–1952), who married polo player Lawrence Waterbury (1878-1943), son of James Waterbury and Katharine (née Furman) Waterbury, in 1900. They divorced in 1912.

Hall died at their estate in the Hudson Valley, just north of Tivoli, at the age of 46, on July 17, 1880. He was buried in the Hall family vault at St. Paul's Episcopal Church Cemetery in Tivoli, New York. His widow, who maintained various New York homes at 11 West 37th Street and 20 Gramercy Park (next door to Stuyvesant Fish at 19 Gramercy Park), also died at their Hudson Valley estate on August 14, 1919, at the age of 77. The Hudson Valley home was owned by their daughter Maude, which Eleanor continued to visit into the 1950s.

=== Descendants ===
Through his eldest daughter Anna, he was the grandfather of First Lady of the United States Anna Eleanor Roosevelt (1884–1962), who married her fifth cousin Franklin Delano Roosevelt (later President of the United States); Elliott Roosevelt, Jr. (1889–1893), who died young; and Gracie Hall Roosevelt (1891–1941).
