= Albert G. Winterhalter =

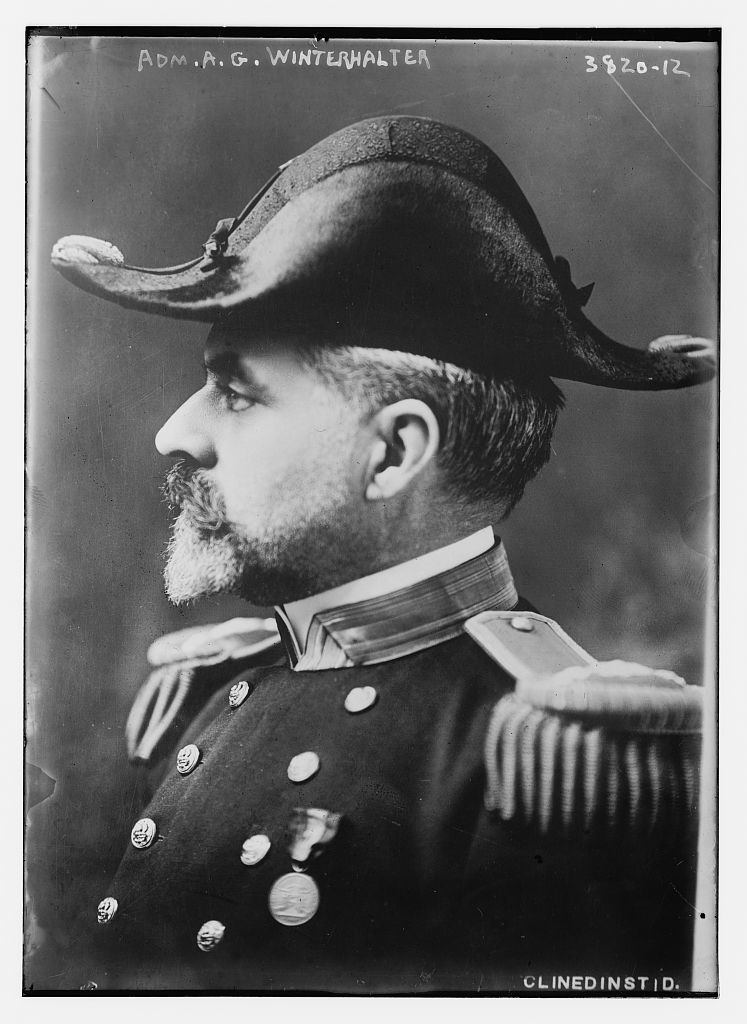
- Admiral Winterhalter circa 1915
- Born: October 5, 1856; Detroit, Michigan, U.S.
- Died: June 5, 1920 (aged 63); United States Naval Hospital; Washington, D.C., U.S.
- Burial place: Arlington National Cemetery
- Spouse: Helen Dauvray
- Military career
- Allegiance: United States of America
- Branch: United States Navy
- Service years: 1877 to 1920
- Rank: Admiral
- Commands: United States Asiatic Fleet

Albert Gustav Winterhalter (October 5, 1856 – June 5, 1920) was an admiral in the United States Navy. He was commander in chief of the U.S. Asiatic Fleet from 1915 to 1917. He could speak or read eleven languages by the time he was appointed to command the Asiatic Fleet.

== Biography ==
He was born in Detroit, Michigan, on October 5, 1856, to John Winterhalter. Winterhalter was appointed to the U.S. Naval Academy from the First Congressional District of Michigan, graduating in 1877.

Winterhalter lost an eye to an archery accident in 1877.

Winterhalter spent much of his career in scientific posts. He was assigned to the U.S. Naval Observatory from January 1885 to November 1889, during which time he served as the U.S. delegate to the International Astrophotographic Congress in Paris, France, and visited the principal observatories of Europe. His report on the tour was published in 1889. He was also responsible for the Naval Observatory Exhibit at the Chicago World's Fair in 1893.

While stationed in San Francisco in 1896, he married Broadway actress Helen Dauvray.

In 1898, as flag lieutenant to Rear Admiral J.M. Miller, Commander in Chief Pacific Station, Winterhalter personally arranged the hoisting of the American flag at the ceremonies attending the transfer of sovereignty of the Hawaiian Islands to the U.S. He assumed command of the gunboat Elcano in 1902 and of the gunboat Paducah in 1905. As Aide for Material from 1914 to 1915, he was a principal assistant to the Secretary of the Navy and an ex-officio voting member of the General Board of the Navy. He took command of the U.S. Asiatic Fleet on July 11, 1915, and ranked as a full admiral for the duration of his tour, reverting to his permanent rank of rear admiral upon relinquishing command in 1917.

Winterhalter was Hydrographer of the Navy from May 1908 to January 1910. In 1916, he conducted experiments aboard the armored cruiser USS Washington to evaluate acoustic ranging techniques. He sailed Washington on different courses relative to a lightship that was transmitting radio waves and air- and water-mediated sound waves, and found that submarine sound waves were a more reliable guide than air-mediated sound. This was the first attempt to determine distance using acoustics, and a similar technique was later used for hydrographic surveys.

During World War I, Winterhalter served as a member of the General Board of the Navy in advising the Department upon many matters of great importance relating to the conduct of the war and was decorated with the Navy Distinguished Service Medal for his service.

He died of lobar pneumonia on June 5, 1920, in Washington, D.C., at the United States Naval Hospital. He was buried in Arlington National Cemetery. His widow died three years later.

== Dates of rank ==
- Cadet Midshipman – September 24, 1873
- Midshipman – June 18, 1877
- Ensign – July 10, 1880
- Lieutenant (junior grade) – December 14, 1886
- Lieutenant – June 30, 1892
- Lieutenant Commander – unknown
- Commander – July 1, 1905
- Captain – 1909
- Rear Admiral – 1915
- Admiral – July 11, 1915

Military offices
Preceded by Walter C. Cowles	Commander in Chief, United States Asiatic Fleet; 9 July 1915–4 April 1917	Succeeded by Austin M. Knight
