= W. Sheffield Cowles =

American politician (1898–1986)

Member of the Connecticut House of Representatives from Farmington
- In office 1949–1957
- Preceded by: Louis Shapiro; Edward C. Swan
- Succeeded by: George S. Robotham; Richard C. Noyes

Speaker of the Connecticut House of Representatives
- In office 1955
- Preceded by: Arthur E. B. Tanner
- Succeeded by: Nelson C. L. Brown II

Personal details
- Born: William Sheffield Cowles Jr. October 6, 1898
- Died: May 2, 1986 (aged 87) Farmington, Connecticut, U.S.
- Party: Republican
- Spouse: Margaret Alywn Krech (m. 1921)
- Children: 1
- Parent(s): William S. Cowles (father); Bamie Roosevelt (mother)
- Relatives: Theodore Roosevelt (uncle); Elliott Roosevelt (uncle); Corinne Roosevelt Robinson (aunt); Robert Roosevelt (granduncle); Theodore Roosevelt Jr. (first cousin); James Roosevelt (first cousin once removed); Franklin D. Roosevelt Jr. (first cousin once removed)
- Education: Yale University
- Nickname: Sheff

William Sheffield Cowles Jr. (October 6, 1898 – May 2, 1986) was an American politician. He served as a Republican member of the Connecticut House of Representatives from 1949 to 1957.

== Early life ==
William Sheffield Cowles Jr. was born to Bamie (née Roosevelt) and William S. Cowles. His father was a rear admiral and served in the Connecticut House of Representatives. He was also the nephew of Theodore Roosevelt. Cowles grew up in Washington, D.C., and Farmington, Connecticut. He attended school in Farmington and in Groton, Massachusetts. He graduated from Yale University in 1921.

== Career ==
During World War I, Cowles joined an officer's training program in Virginia. When it came time for his commission, he was told by his commanding officer he was too young. U.S. senator Henry Cabot Lodge passed a bill so Cowles could be commissioned with the United States Marine Corps. He attained the rank of first lieutenant. During World War II, he served in the Pacific with the United States Naval Reserve and served on the staff of William Halsey Jr.. He rose to the rank of captain. Following the war, he retired to Farmington.

Cowles was a Republican. He was elected to represent Farmington in the Connecticut House of Representatives in 1948. He served in the contingent expenses, banks, engrossed bills, and executive nominations committees. In the 1953 session, he was chairman of the finance committee. He served as speaker of the House of Representatives from 1953 to 1955. He did not seek re-election in 1956.

In 1950, Cowles became town chairman of Farmington. He was head of the speakers' bureau of the Connecticut Republican headquarters. He served as mayor of Farmington from 1956 to 1960. By 1955, he was a member of a New York City brokerage firm. He also worked as an investment counselor. He was later a senior partner of Wood-Walker & Co., a Wall Street firm. He was president of the New York Orthopedic Hospital when it merged into the NewYork-Presbyterian Hospital. He later served on its board of trustees. He was also a trustee of Miss Porter's School in Farmington. He was a member of the alumni council of Yale University and a fellow of Saybrook College in Yale.

== Personal life ==
Cowles married Margaret Alywn Krech, daughter of Alvin W. Krech, on July 9, 1921. They had a son, William S. Jr.

Cowles went by the nickname "Sheff". He died on May 2, 1986, at his home in Farmington.
