= Eliza Trask Hill =

American suffragist, journalist, philanthropist

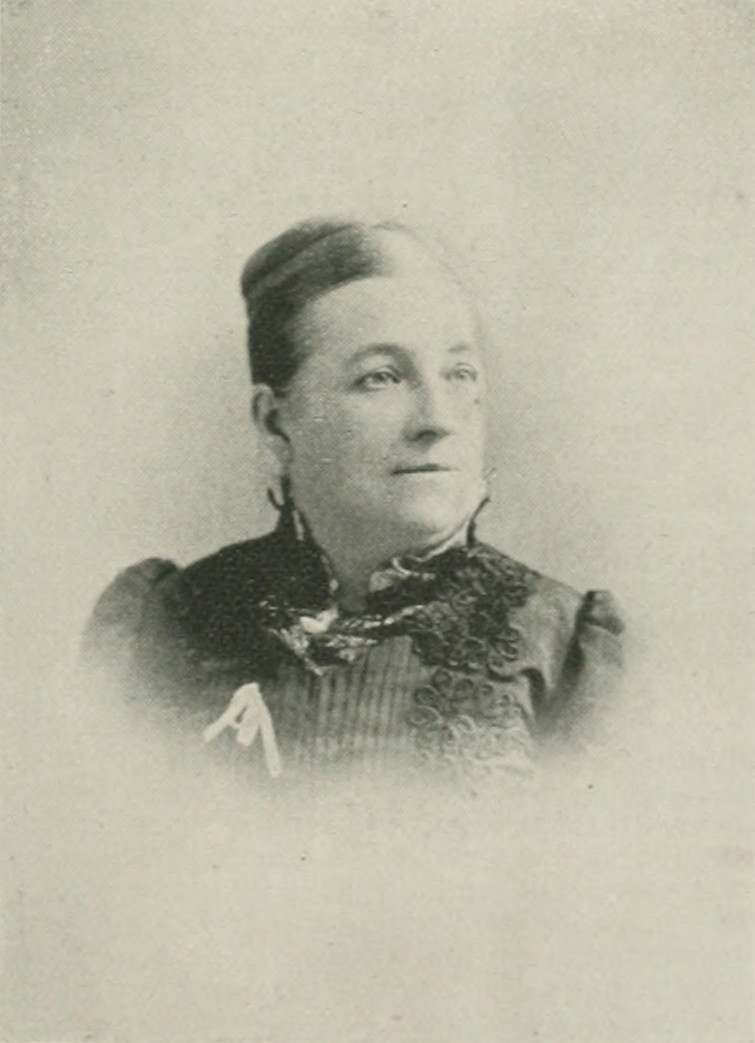
- "A Woman of the Century"
- Born: Eliza Sessions Carpenter Trask; May 10, 1840 Warren, Massachusetts, U.S.
- Died: March 29, 1908 (aged 67) Somerville, Massachusetts, U.S.
- Resting place: Laurel Hill Cemetery, Fitchburg, Massachusetts, U.S.
- Occupation: activist, journalist, philanthropist
- Language: English
- Genre: newspaper
- Spouse: John Lange Hill (m. 1867)
- Children: 3
- Relatives: Francis Cooke

Eliza Trask Hill (née, Trask; May 10, 1840 – March 29, 1908) was an American activist, journalist, and philanthropist of the long nineteenth century. During the Civil War, Hill obtained, by subscription, and presented a flag to the Fifteenth Massachusetts Regiment. Her presentation speech was so patriotic that it produced a marked effect and was widely quoted. For ten years, she was a teacher. At the age of 26, she married John Lange Hill; they had two sons and a daughter.

Hill was one of the first to join the Woman's Christian Temperance Union (WCTU), and has served in an official capacity in that body from its beginning, becoming connected with the prison and jail department. She labored for the redemption of abandoned women, but, believing that preventive is more effectual than reformatory work, she identified herself with the societies that cared for and helped working women. From 1879, when the right of school suffrage was grunted to the women of Massachusetts, she was actively engaged in politics, having worked for the Prohibition Party. Her services as an advocate of the Australian ballot system were in great demand. During the public school agitation in Boston in 1888, when 20,000 women rescued the public schools from mismanagement, Hill was among the leaders of the movement, making plans for the campaign, helping to rally the women, and by her addresses, arousing both men and women. For several years, she served as the president of the ward and city committee of Protestant Independent Women Voters, a recognized political organization, and anti-Catholic in its campaigning. When the need of a party organ was felt, Hill, unaided at first, began the publication, in Boston, of a weekly newspaper, which later was cared for by a stock company of women. Hill was editor of the paper, which was called the Woman's Voice and Public School Champion. Hill was active in the woman's suffrage movement.

== Early life and education ==
Eliza Sessions Carpenter Trask was born in Warren, Massachusetts, May 10, 1840.

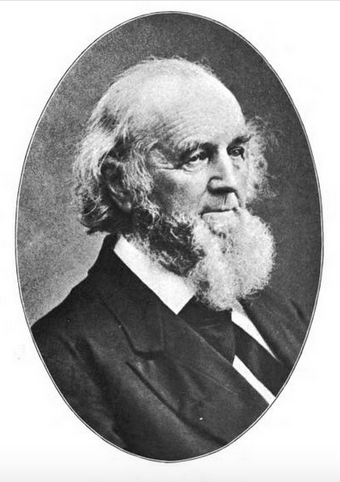
Rev. George Trask

Her father, George Trask, a native of Beverly, Massachusetts, belonging to that branch of the Trask family founded by Osmond (or Osman) Trask, an English immigrant who settled there, was a son of Jeremiah Trask and one of the youngest of fourteen children. After devoting his attention for some years in his early manhood to business pursuits, Mr. Trask took up his studies at Bowdoin College, to prepare for the ministry, paying his own way. While there, he became conspicuous for his advocacy of the anti-slavery cause. He was graduated from Bowdoin in 1826 and from Andover Theological Seminary in 1829. His first pastorate was in Framingham, Massachusetts, his next in Warren, and his third and last in Fitchburg, Massachusetts, of the Trinitarian Church, a society that stood for the principles of anti-slavery and which disbanded as soon as the slaves were freed. The last twenty-five years of his life, Mr. Trask spent in the effort to abate the use of tobacco. He suffered persecution for his pronounced views, was forbidden the use of the churches, and ridiculed by his colleagues in the ministry. He died in Fitchburg in January, 1875.

Hill's mother, whose maiden name was Ruth Freeman Packard, was a native of Marlborough, Massachusetts, and daughter of the Rev. Asa and Nancy (Quincy) Packard. Mrs. Packard was born in the old Quincy mansion, Quincy, Massachusetts, being a daughter of Josiah Quincy and cousin to Dorothy Quincy, wife of Governor John Hancock. The Rev. Asa Packard was a son of Jacob Packard, whose father, Solomon, was grandson of Samuel Packard, an early settler of West Bridgewater, Massachusetts. Solomon Packard's wife, Susanna, mother of Jacob, was a daughter of Samuel and Mary (Mitchell) Kingman. Her mother was the daughter of Jacob Mitchell and granddaughter of Experience Mitchell by his wife Jane, who was a daughter of Francis Cooke, one of the Mayflower Pilgrims. The Rev. Asa Packard (H. C. 1783) was for about twenty years minister of the town and church of Marlboro, being subsequently settled over the West Parish of Marlboro, where he remained till May, 1819. After his retirement, he removed to Lancaster, Massachusetts, where his daughter's marriage took place in 1831. Mrs. Trask was in complete sympathy with her husband in all his reform work.

Hill's siblings were: George Kellogg Trask, later with the Indianapolis Journal as railroad editor; Brainerd Packard Trask, a United States navy officer; Josiah Chapin Trask, who was killed in Quantrell's raid in Lawrence, Kansas; Ruth Quincy Trask, the widow of Lewis Bellows Powell, of Scranton, Pennsylvania; and William Dodge Trask, who died in infancy.

Hill had vivid remembrances of the stirring words of William Lloyd Garrison, Wendell Phillips, Lucy Stone, and other early reformers who were frequent visitors at her father's house in her childhood. The acquaintance thus formed with Lucy Stone lasted until Stone's death.

Hill received her education in the public schools of Fitchburg, where she was a pupil of Eli A. Hubbard.

== Career ==
=== Teacher ===
Immediately after her graduation from the high school, in 1856, she began to teach school in Franklin, Massachusetts. A member of the school board inquired if she had brought a certificate of moral character, to which she replied, "All the moral character I have, sir, I have with me." A year later, she was asked to take a school in one of the outlying districts of Fitchburg. The school was a hard one to discipline, and the first great test of her courage came at this point in her career. The Civil War was in progress, and in her district were a number of people who had been greatly opposed to her appointment because of her father's abolitionist views, with which she was known to sympathize. On this account, she was refused board in the neighborhood, but was not thus deterred from taking the school. For three months, she walked daily 6 miles (9.7 km) to teach the school, and not only were the unruly children brought into subjection, but all the parents, including her bitterest opponent, became her firm friends.

Going to Indianapolis to teach in 1864, she went about with Superintendent Abram C. Shortridge to grade the schools of that city. Later, she taught for a year in Terre Haute, Indiana. Two of her pupils, while teacher of an intermediate grade in Fitchburg, were Maurice Howe Richardson (surgeon of Boston) and Edward Peter Pierce (Justice of the Massachusetts Superior Court).

=== Activist ===
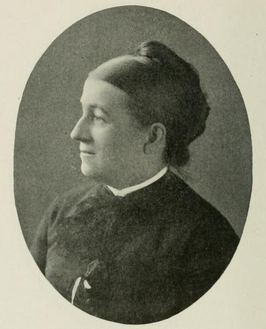
Eliza Trask Hill

During the Civil War, Hill (then Miss Trask) collected money to give a flag to the Washington Guards of Fitchburg, presenting it the night previous to their departure for the battlefield, urging the soldiers to fight courageously for the freedom of the slave. At these words, the colonel of the regiment took offense, and in a cruel way denied that that was the issue. But brave men defended the young woman. When the Soldiers' Monument in Fitchburg was dedicated, some years after the close of the war, Hill with her two children was at her father's home. The company, much depleted, passed by, bearing the tattered flag, which had been through many battles. The two children, one representing a soldier, the other the Goddess of Liberty, were standing upon the porch of the old homestead. As the company reached the house, they halted, and saluted the children; Hill, from behind the children, responded to the graceful tribute. The colonel before his death acknowledged his mistake, and apologized for his rudeness at the time of the flag presentation.

In June, 1867, she married John Lange Hill (1845–1930), of Boston. When the WCTU was organized (1873), Hill, who was then residing in Braintree, Massachusetts, was chosen the first president for Norfolk County, Massachusetts. Thereafter, she held some official position in that society. For ten years, she was superintendent of the prison, jail, and almshouse department, and was later superintendent in this department for Middlesex County, Massachusetts, and president of the Winter Hill WCTU of Somerville, Massachusetts.

When the Australian ballot system was introduced in Massachusetts, Hill was appointed by the Prohibition State Committee to go from town to town with the apparatus illustrating the process of voting under the new system; and large audiences composed of all parties came to see and hear. No opportunity was lost by the speaker to remind her hearers of the inconsistency of allowing a woman to instruct men in the process of voting and denying her the right to vote herself.

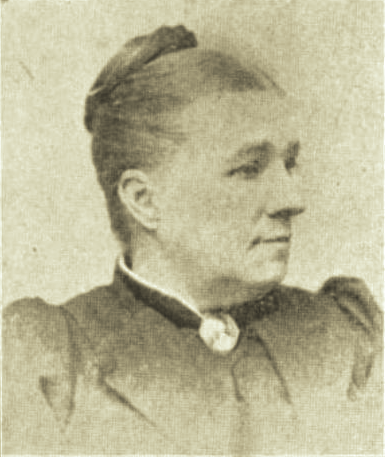
Standard encyclopedia of the alcohol problem)

In 1885, the New England Helping Hand Society was formed, its aim being to provide at a moderate rate a comfortable home for young women earning low wages. Of this society, Hill was for several years the secretary, and for ten years, she was its president. She aided in many ways in ameliorating the conditions of working men and women.

In 1888, Hill's residence was in Charlestown. For two years, she had been president of the Ward and City Committee of Women Voters, and she was also president of the Bunker Hill Woman's Educational League, an organization that was formed in February. Through the efforts of this organization alone, 2,600 women were assessed, with a view to taking part in the school election; and a most vigorous campaign was carried on, women being stationed at the various registration places to watch proceedings. The result of the election was gratifying. Not only was the whole school board ticket successful, but the women had significant influence in bringing about a change at City Hall.

While serving as president of the Charlestown branch of the Loyal Women of American Liberty, the Independent Women Voters' party became the outgrowth of the struggle of 1888, and until 1896, Hill was the leader of this party. In 1889, the Woman's Voice and Public School Champion was first printed. Hill became the editor and general manager (1890–1907)).

In 1895, she was chosen State secretary of the Massachusetts Branch of the International Order of the King's Daughters and Sons, an organization having 6,000 members in the State, comprising 270 circles and 229 independent members, who carried on charitable work. A vacation home at Hanson, Massachusetts, which accommodated 60 people, among them many mothers and their young families, was a State work. The vacation home of The King's Daughters is Gordon Rest. For eighteen years, Hill had personal supervision of this home. The work increased year by year, and was the largest undertaking of its kind in the State.

She always stood firmly for free speech. For eighteen years, Hill's voice was heard in pulpit and on platform in the advocacy of good causes in Massachusetts and other States. The Independent Women Voters of Detroit, Michigan, were organized by her efforts. In Hill's evangelistic and Bible services, a simple faith was taught, with a reliance on Christ as mediator and Saviour.

The result of labor in prisons and missions was gratifying in the reconstruction of broken-up homes, in the obtaining of employment for disheartened men and women, and in the redemption of those who had developed bad habits. Following in the footsteps of her father, she helped the anti-cigarette movement and was instrumental in banding hundreds of young people together to labor in Christian service. Possessed of a hopeful, cheerful temperament, obstacles which might seem to others very hard to overcome did not hinder or discourage Hill.

== Personal life ==
The Rev. George Trask was a man of very liberal ideas; and, when his daughter was asked to become a member of a company of her town's people to give amateur theatricals for the benefit of the United States Sanitary Commission, he readily gave his consent. With Mary Ann Vincent of the Boston Museum as teacher, plays were given throughout the winter, which netted a large sum. Mr. Trask always attended, by his presence giving sanction to the entertainments. The benefit of Vincent's teaching was felt by Hill.

Hill had three children: George Sumner Hill, a graduate of Harvard Medical School; Julia Annie Hill, a graduate of Wellesley College; and Lewis Powell Hill.

Hill became ill in 1905. She died March 29, 1908, Somerville, Massachusetts, and was buried at Laurel Hill Cemetery, Fitchburg, Massachusetts.
