= Wyman Richardson =

American writer and naturalist

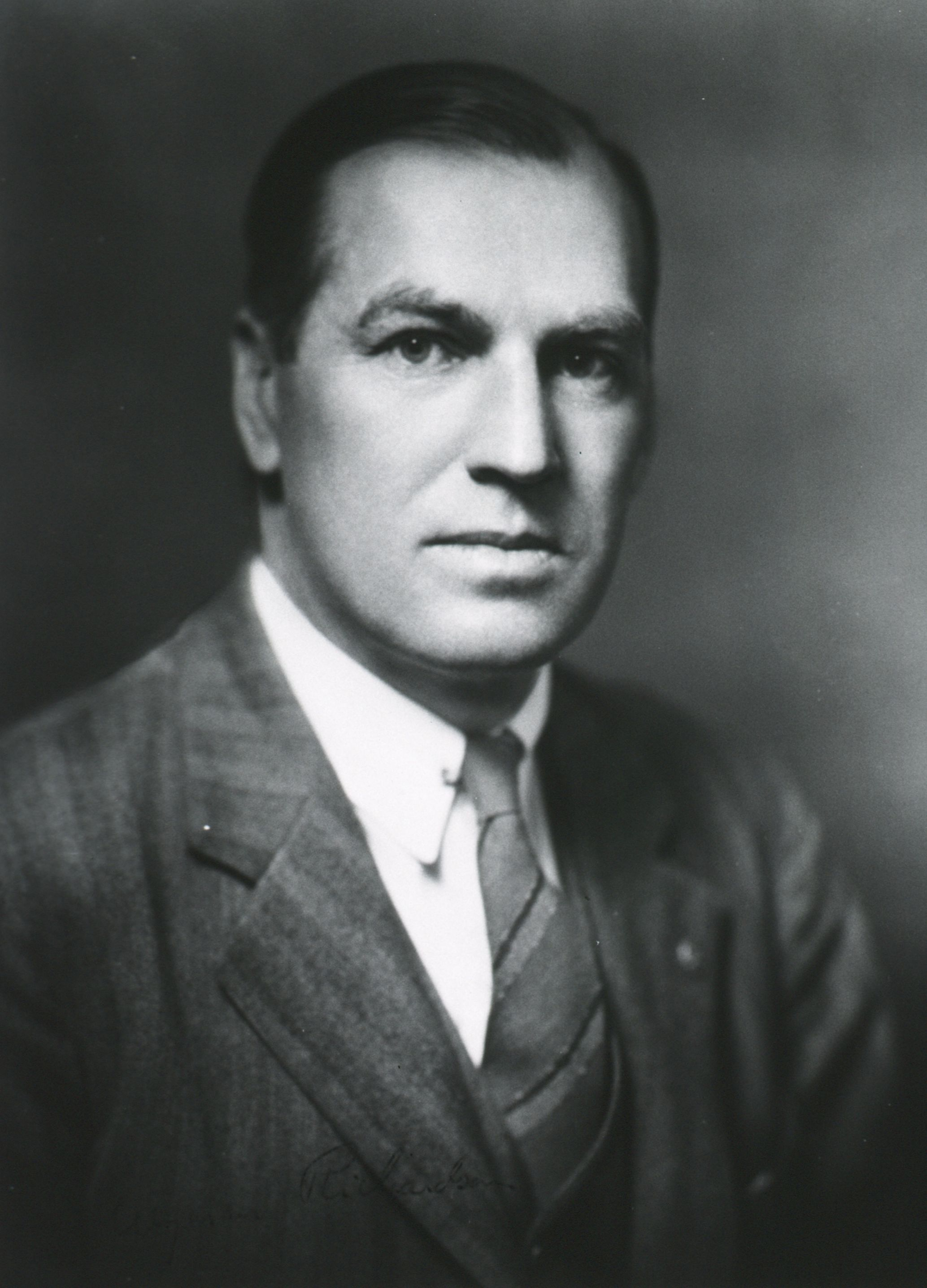
Wyman Richardson, circa 1940

Wyman Richardson (August 3, 1896 – 1953) was an American physician, professor, amateur naturalist, and author. He is best known for his 1947 book The House on Nauset Marsh, originally published as essays in The Atlantic Monthly during the 1940s.

== Early life ==
Wyman Richardson was born August 3, 1896, in Marion, Massachusetts. His father was the noted surgeon Maurice Howe Richardson.

Richardson graduated with A.B. from Harvard University in 1917 and went on to earn an M.D. from Harvard Medical School.

== Career ==
Richardson had a family practice on Beacon Street in Boston. He also taught hematology at Harvard Medical School and Massachusetts General Hospital.

Richardson's 1947 book The House on Nauset Marsh: A Cape Cod Memoir is a collection of essays previously published in The Atlantic Monthly during the 1940s.The book was originally published by the Atlantic Monthly Company.

He continued to provide essays for The Atlantic Monthly up until his death; the magazine also published more of his essays after his death. The first edition of his book was reprinted in 1955 by W. W. Norton and in 1972 by Chatham Press.

== Personal life ==
Richardson married Charlotte Blake Richardson and was the father of several children. They lived in Newton, Massachusetts.

The family made frequent trips to their Cape Cod vacation home in Eastham, which became the source of Richardson's literary fame. Richardson's escape was a marsh-side farmhouse purchased by his father and two other family members.

He died in Boston, Massachusetts in 1953.

== Legacy ==
Along with Thoreau's 1865 Cape Cod, Beston's 1928 The Outermost House, and Hay's 1963 The Great Beach, Richardson's book is considered a regional classic in Cape Cod nature writing. Countryman Press reissued The House on Nauset Marsh in 1997 and released a 50th anniversary edition in 2005.

The Eastham house is still owned by the Richardson family and is now within the boundaries of the Cape Cod National Seashore. The Nauset Marsh Trail is open to the public.

== Selected publications ==
=== Books ===
- The House on Nauset Marsh: A Cape Cod Memoir. Boston: Atlantic Monthly Company, 1947.

=== Magazine articles ===
- "The Stripers Are In". The Atlantic, September 1947.
- "Winds Along the Dunes". The Atlantic, April 1948.
- "September Sea". The Atlantic, September 1948.
- Animal Instinct--or Intelligence". The Atlantic, August 1949.
- "October Mornings". The Atlantic, November 1949.
- "Bird Language". The Atlantic, May 1950.
- "Fog". The Atlantic, September 1951.
- "Do-Nothing Day". The Atlantic, September 1952.
- "Blue Crabbing on Cape Cod". The Atlantic, July 1953.
- "Around the Horn". The Atlantic, September 1954.
- "The Big Owl". The Atlantic, July 1955.
