= Walter C. Cowles =

American naval officer (1853–1917)

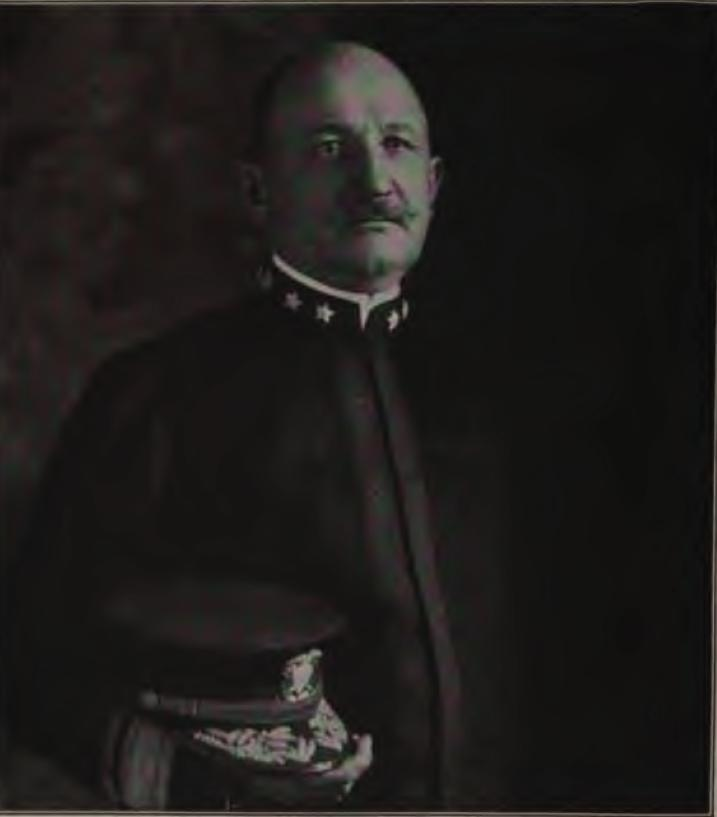
- Admiral Walter C. Cowles
- Born: July 11, 1853; Farmington, Connecticut, U.S.
- Died: November 27, 1917 (aged 64); Redlands, California, U.S.
- Relatives: William S. Cowles (brother)
- Military career
- Allegiance: United States of America
- Branch: United States Navy
- Service years: 1873–1915
- Rank: Admiral
- Commands: U.S. Pacific Fleet, U.S. Asiatic Fleet

Walter Cleveland Cowles (July 11, 1853 – November 27, 1917) was an admiral in the United States Navy. He served as commander in chief of the U.S. Pacific Fleet and commander in chief of the U.S. Asiatic Fleet.

== Biography ==
Born in Connecticut, Cowles entered the U.S. Naval Academy at the age of sixteen, graduating in 1873. As captain of the battleship USS Kentucky, he sailed around the world with the Great White Fleet in 1908–1909. He commanded the U.S. Pacific Fleet from 1913 to 1914 and the U.S. Asiatic Fleet from 1914 to 1915.

In March 1915, Cowles became one of the first full admirals in the history of the U.S. Navy when the three commanders in chief of the Atlantic, Pacific, and Asiatic Fleets were all advanced to the temporary rank of full admiral while so serving. Upon relinquishing command of the Asiatic Fleet in June 1915, Cowles reverted to his permanent rank of rear admiral.

Cowles retired in August 1915. He died in Redlands, California, on November 27, 1917.

His brother was rear admiral William S. Cowles.

== Dates of rank ==
- Midshipman – May 1873
- Ensign – July 1874
- Master – August 1879
- Lieutenant, junior grade – March 1883
- Lieutenant – December 1885
- Lieutenant commander – unknown
- Commander – unknown
- Captain – unknown
- Rear admiral – 1911
- Admiral – March 10, 1915

Military offices
Preceded by William Henry Hudson Southerland	Commander in Chief, United States Pacific Fleet; 1913–January 1914	Succeeded by Thomas B. Howard
Preceded by Reginald F. Nicholson	Commander-in-Chief, United States Asiatic Fleet; 3 May 1914–9 July 1915	Succeeded by Albert G. Winterhalter
