= William S. Cowles =

US Navy admiral and brother-in-law of President Theodore Roosevelt (1846–1923)

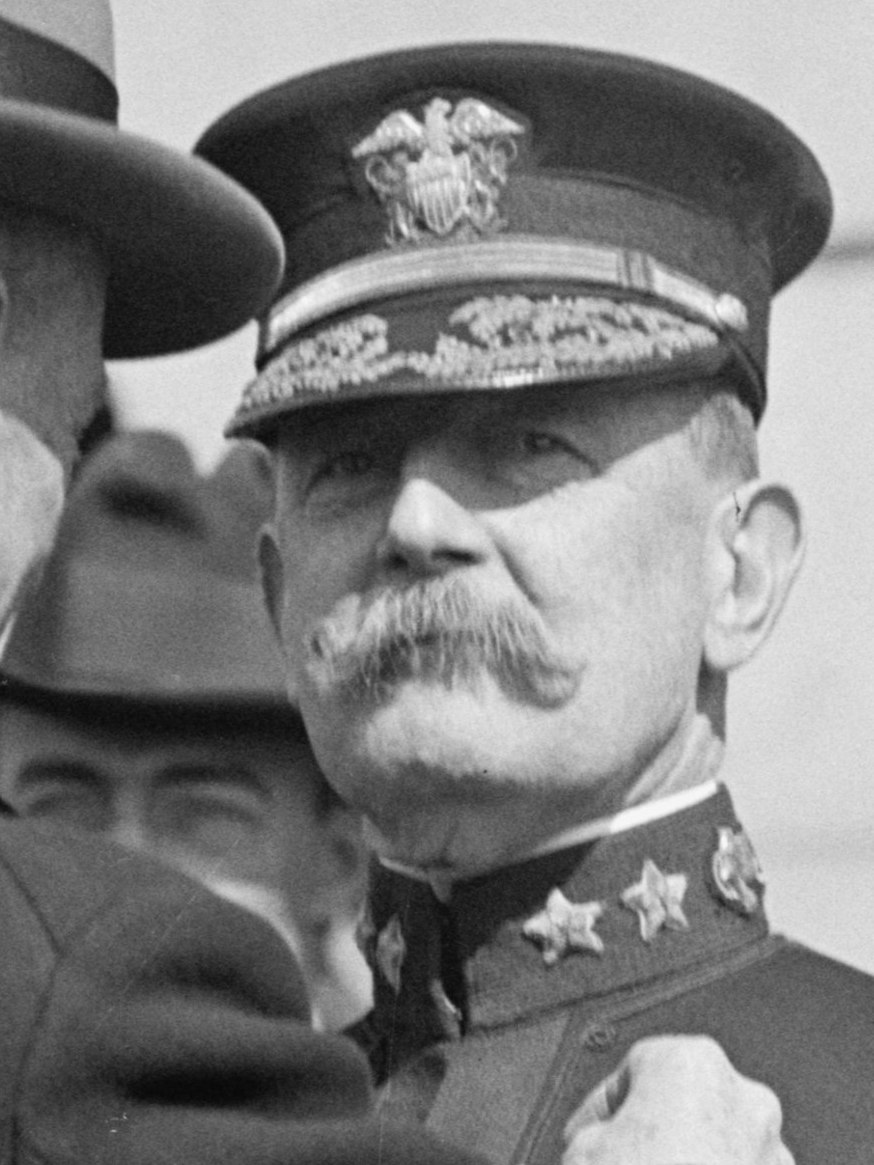
- Photo of Cowles in 1919
- Born: William Sheffield Cowles; August 1, 1846; Farmington, Connecticut, U.S.
- Died: May 1, 1923 (aged 76); Farmington, Connecticut, U.S.
- Burial place: Farmington Cemetery
- Spouses: Mary Thurman (m. 1873; div. 1889) Bamie Roosevelt (m. 1895)
- Children: W. Sheffield Cowles
- Relatives: Walter C. Cowles (brother)
- Military career
- Allegiance: United States
- Branch: United States Navy
- Service years: 1863–1908
- Rank: Rear Admiral
- Conflicts: Spanish–American War

Member of the Connecticut House of Representatives from the Farmington district
- In office 1917–1919 Serving with Wilson W. Robotham; Harry C. Ney

Personal details
- Party: Republican

William Sheffield Cowles (August 1, 1846 – May 1, 1923) was a rear admiral in the United States Navy.

== Early life ==
William Sheffield Cowles was born on August 1, 1846, in Farmington, Connecticut, to Elizabeth (née Sheffield) and Thomas Cowles. His brother was rear admiral Walter C. Cowles. He attended public schools in Farmington.

== Career ==
In July 1863 he was appointed an acting midshipman at the United States Naval Academy and graduated in June 1867. He was commissioned as an ensign in 1869. He was promoted to lieutenant in 1871 and lieutenant commander in 1892. He was commissioned as a commander on June 5, 1898.

In 1884, Cowles served on the Isthmus of Panama. From 1891 to 1892, he served as naval aide and was in charge of the naval militia. From 1893 to 1897, he was naval attache at the U.S. embassy in London. From 1897 to 1898, he commanded the USS Fern. He commanded the gunboat Topeka during the Spanish–American War, and served as naval aide to President McKinley. From 1903 to 1905, he was in command of the battleship Missouri. He commanded the ship when it collided with the Illinois, and when thirty-three men were killed in an explosion (he was cleared of responsibility in both cases). After September 30, 1899, he served briefly as assistant chief of the bureau of navigation. He was also naval aide to Theodore Roosevelt. He was promoted to captain on November 2, 1902. In 1906, he was chief of the board of equipment and a member of the board of construction. He was named rear admiral on April 23, 1908. In July 1908, he was the American naval representative at the Quebec Tercentenary.

He served as the Commander-in-Chief, Asiatic Fleet. He retired from the Navy on August 1, 1908. At the time of his retirement, he was in command of the USS New Hampshire. He remained as chief of the bureau of equipment of the navy department until 1910. He was a companion of the District of Columbia Commandery of the Military Order of the Loyal Legion of the United States and an honorary companion of the Connecticut Commandery of the Military Order of Foreign Wars. On December 2, 1908, Cowles submitted a report, prepared by Lieutenant George C. Sweet, recommending the purchase of aircraft suitable for operating from naval ships on scouting and observation mission to the Secretary of the Navy. He was an official representative at the coronation of King George V in 1911.

During World War I, Cowles helped form the Farmington Home Guard and was detailed to the Connecticut River Patrol. He was a member of the personal staff of General Lucien F. Burpee. He was chairman of the naval and military committee of the Connecticut State Council of Defense. He was a member of the Farmington borough council. In 1914, he was naval aide to Connecticut Governor Marcus H. Holcomb. He was elected as a Republican and served in the Connecticut House of Representatives from 1917 to 1919.

== Personal life ==
Cowles married Mary Thurman, the oldest daughter of Ohio politician Allen G. Thurman, on February 18, 1873. In November 1889, Thurman divorced Cowles. They did not have any children.

On November 25, 1895, Cowles married Anna "Bamie" Roosevelt, daughter of philanthropist Theodore Roosevelt Sr. and socialite Martha Stewart "Mittie" Bulloch and elder sister of President Theodore "T.R." Roosevelt Jr. William and Bamie had one son, William Jr. (1898–1986), who was a Connecticut State Representative and Mayor of Farmington. William and Bamie are buried at Riverside Cemetery in Farmington, Connecticut.

In 1911, he moved back to Farmington permanently. He was a member of the Congregational Church and taught in the Sunday school. He was a member of the University Club of New York, the New York Yacht Club, the Seawanhaka Corinthian Yacht Club, the Metropolitan Club and the Tennis and Racquet Club.

Cowles died of a heart ailment on May 1, 1923, at his Oldgate home in Farmington. He was buried in Farmington Cemetery.

Military offices
Preceded by Willard H. Brownson	Commander-in-Chief, United States Asiatic Fleet; 1907–August 1908	Succeeded by John Hubbard
