= Bibliography of Eleanor Roosevelt =

Eleanor Roosevelt
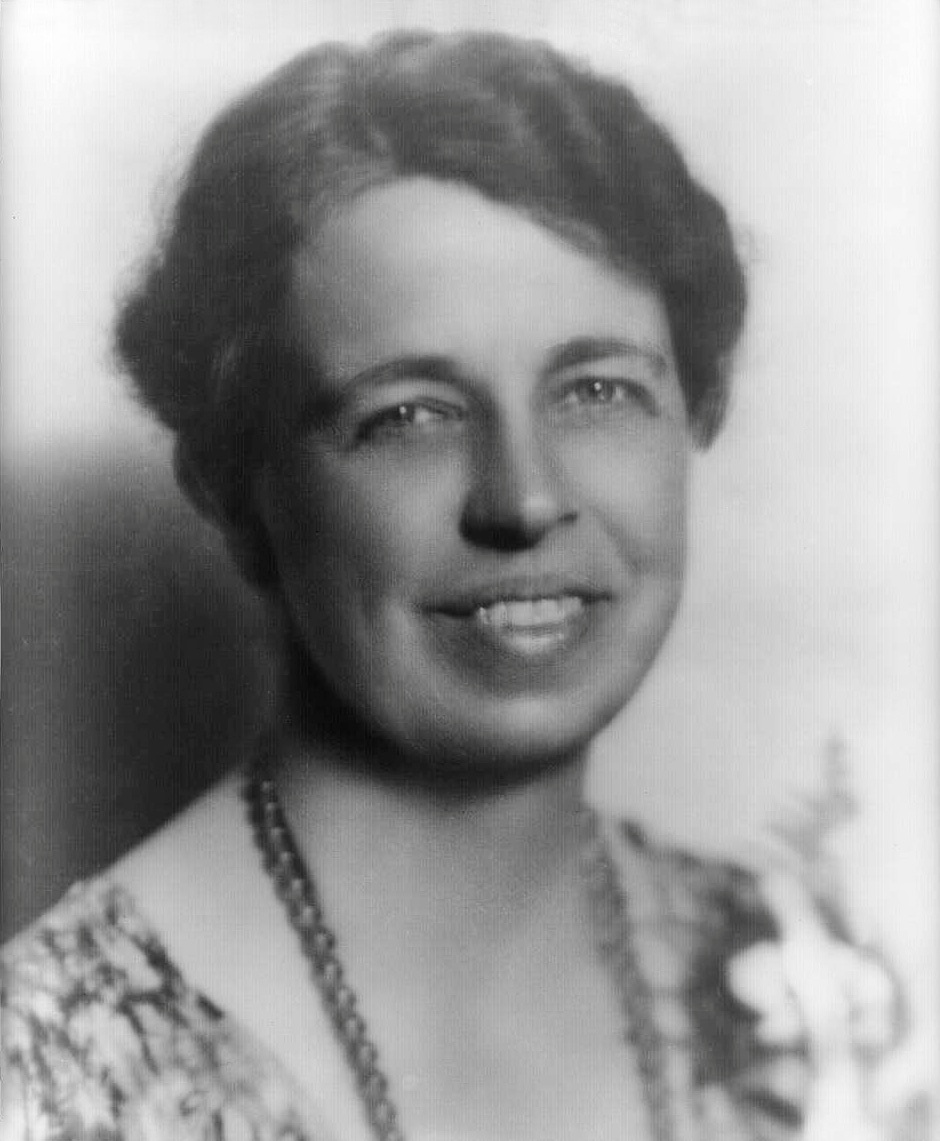
- Roosevelt in 1933

1st Chair of the Presidential Commission on the Status of Women
- In office January 20, 1961 – November 7, 1962
- President: John F. Kennedy
- Preceded by: Position established
- Succeeded by: Esther Peterson

1st United States Representative to the United Nations Commission on Human Rights
- In office January 27, 1947 – January 20, 1953
- President: Harry S. Truman
- Preceded by: Position established
- Succeeded by: Mary Pillsbury Lord

1st Chair of the United Nations Commission on Human Rights
- In office April 29, 1946 – December 30, 1952
- Preceded by: Position established
- Succeeded by: Charles Malik

First Lady of the United States
- In role March 4, 1933 – April 12, 1945
- President: Franklin D. Roosevelt
- Preceded by: Lou Henry Hoover
- Succeeded by: Bess Truman

First Lady of New York
- In role January 1, 1929 – December 31, 1932
- Governor: Franklin D. Roosevelt
- Preceded by: Catherine Dunn
- Succeeded by: Edith Altschul

Personal details
- Born: Anna Eleanor Roosevelt; October 11, 1884 New York City, U.S.
- Died: November 7, 1962 (aged 78) New York City, U.S.
- Cause of death: Cardiac failure complicated by tuberculosis
- Resting place: Home of FDR National Historic Site, Hyde Park, New York
- Party: Democratic
- Spouse: Franklin D. Roosevelt (m. 1905; died 1945)
- Children: 6 including Franklin, Anna, Elliott, James, and John
- Parents: Elliott Bulloch Roosevelt; Anna Rebecca Hall
- Relatives: See Roosevelt family

Anna Eleanor Roosevelt (October 11, 1884 – November 7, 1962) was the First Lady of the United States, from March 4, 1933 to April 12, 1945; as the wife of President Franklin D. Roosevelt. Because her husband was the longest-serving president, Eleanor is the longest-serving First Lady.

Works listed here are cited in the notes or bibliographies of scholarly sources. Each is published by an academic or major press, written by a recognized expert, or substantially reviewed in scholarly journals; borderline cases are omitted. A selection of primary sources are included. Many of the books below carry their own bibliographies; see the Further reading section for other bibliographies, and the External links section for historical sites, academic sites, and museums.

Citations follow APA style. (Note: Entries are in plain text APA 7 format without templates; templates are used only for reviews and notes.) Book have citations to academic journal or mainstream published reviews when available. For books only partly about the subject, relevant chapter or section titles are provided when useful and available. Translators of the original-language edition are included when possible. In cases where a title or name has appeared with more than one English spelling, the most recent published form is used and a footnote documents any earlier title under which the work appeared.

== Books about Eleanor Roosevelt ==
- Beasley, Maurine Hoffman. Eleanor Roosevelt: Transformative First Lady (University Press of Kansas, 2010) online.
- Beasley, M. H. (1987). Eleanor Roosevelt and the Media: A Public Quest for Self-Fulfillment. Urbana, IL: University of Illinois Press.
- Beauchamp, Angela S. (2024). Eleanor Roosevelt on Screen: The First Lady's Appearances in Film and Television 1932-1962. Jefferson, North Carolina: McFarland & Co.
- Bell-Scott, P. (2016). The Firebrand and the First Lady: Portrait of a Friendship: Pauli Murray, Eleanor Roosevelt, and the Struggle for Social Justice. New York: Alfred A. Knopf.
- Berger, J. (1981). A New Deal for the World: Eleanor Roosevelt and American Foreign Policy. New York: Columbia University Press.
- Black, A. M. (1996). Casting Her Own Shadow: Eleanor Roosevelt and the Shaping of Postwar Liberalism. New York: Columbia University Press.
- Cook, B. W. (1993). Eleanor Roosevelt: Volume One: The Early Years, 1884-1933. London: Bloomsbury.
- Cook, B. W. (2000). Eleanor Roosevelt: Volume Two: The Defining Years, 1933-1938. London: Bloomsbury.
- Cook, B. W. (2016). Eleanor Roosevelt: Volume Three: The War Years and After, 1939-1962. London: Bloomsbury.
- Glendon, M. A. (2001). A World Made New: Eleanor Roosevelt and the Universal Declaration of Human Rights. New York: Random House.
- Golay, M. (2016). America 1933: The Great Depression, Lorena Hickok, Eleanor Roosevelt, and the Shaping of the New Deal. New York: Simon & Schuster.
- Goodwin, D. K. (2013). No Ordinary Time: Franklin and Eleanor Roosevelt: The Home Front in World War II. New York: Simon & Schuster.
- Hareven, T. K. (1975). Eleanor Roosevelt: An American Conscience. New York: Da Capo Press.
- Harris, C. M. (2007). Eleanor Roosevelt. Westport, Conn: Greenwood Press.
- Kearney, R. (1968). Anna Eleanor Roosevelt: The Evolution of a Reformer. Boston: Houghton Mifflin Co.
- Lash, J. P. (1982). Love, Eleanor: Eleanor Roosevelt and her Friends. New York: Doubleday.
- Lash, J. P. (1971). Eleanor and Franklin: The Story of Their Relationship, Based on Eleanor Roosevelt's Private Papers. New York: W. W. Norton.
- Lash, J. P. (1972). Eleanor: The Years Alone. New York: W. W. Norton.
- Lightman, M., & Hoff, J. (1984). Without Precedent: The Life and Career of Eleanor Roosevelt. Bloomington, IN: Indiana University Press.
- Michaelis, David (2020). Eleanor (First hardcover ed.). New York: Simon & Schuster. ISBN 978-1-4391-9201-6. OCLC 1139765459.
- Quinn, Susan. Eleanor and Hick: The love affair that shaped a first lady (Penguin, 2017) online, with Lorena Hickock.
- Youngs, J. W. T. (2006). Eleanor Roosevelt: A Personal and Public Life. New York: Pearson/Longman.

== Journal articles about Eleanor Roosevelt ==
- Abramowitz, M. (1984). Eleanor Roosevelt and the National Youth Administration 1935-1943: An Extension of the Presidency. Presidential Studies Quarterly, 14(4), pp. 569–580.
- Atwell, M. (1979). Eleanor Roosevelt and the Cold War Consensus. Diplomatic History, 3(1), pp. 99–113.
- Beasley, M. (1986). Eleanor Roosevelt's Vision of Journalism: A Communications Medium for Women. Presidential Studies Quarterly, 16(1), pp. 66–75.
- Beauchamp, Angela S. (2020). I Will Not Be Your Little China Doll: Representations of Eleanor Roosevelt in Film and Television. The Journal of American Popular Culture, Spring 2020.19(1).
- Black, A. (1990). Championing a Champion: Eleanor Roosevelt and the Marian Anderson "Freedom Concert". Presidential Studies Quarterly, 20(4), pp. 719–736.
- Black, A. (1999). Struggling with Icons: Memorializing Franklin and Eleanor Roosevelt. The Public Historian, 21(1), pp. 63–72.
- Black, A. (2008). Eleanor Roosevelt and the Universal Declaration of Human Rights. OAH Magazine of History, 22(2), pp. 34–37.
- Blair, D. (2001). No Ordinary Time: Eleanor Roosevelt's Address to the 1940 Democratic National Convention. Rhetoric and Public Affairs, 4(2), pp. 203–222.
- Burke, F. (1984). Eleanor Roosevelt, October 11, 1884-November 7, 1962-She Made a Difference. Public Administration Review, 44(5), pp. 365–372.
- Cook, B. (2000). Woman of the Century: Eleanor Roosevelt's Biographer Assesses the Legacy of a First Lady Who Sought Justice for All. The Women's Review of Books, 17(10/11), pp. 22–23.
- Erikson, J. (1964). Nothing to Fear: Notes on the Life of Eleanor Roosevelt. Daedalus, 93(2), pp. 781–801.
- Fogel, D. (1974). Eleanor Roosevelt Writes From European Tour, 1918. The Georgia Review, 28(4), pp. 703–704.
- Gilbert, S., & Shollenberger, K. (2001). Eleanor Roosevelt and the Declaration of Human Rights: A Simulation Activity. OAH Magazine of History, 15(3), pp. 35–36.
- Graham, H. (1987). The Paradox of Eleanor Roosevelt: Alcoholism's Child. The Virginia Quarterly Review, 63(2), pp. 210–230.
- Grant, P. (1979). Catholic Congressmen, Cardinal Spellman, Eleanor Roosevelt, and the 1949-1950 Federal Aid to Education Controversy. Records of the American Catholic Historical Society of Philadelphia, 90(1/4), pp. 3–13.
- Hobbins, A. (1998). Eleanor Roosevelt, John Humphrey: And Canadian Opposition to the Universal Declaration of Human Rights: Looking Back on the 50th Annivesary [sic] of UNDHR. International Journal, 53(2), pp. 325–342.
- Miller, K. (1999). A Volume Of Friendship: The Correspondence of Isabella Greenway and Eleanor Roosevelt, 1904-1953. The Journal of Arizona History, 40(2), pp. 121–156.
- Patton, T. (2006). "What Of Her?" Eleanor Roosevelt and Camp Tera. New York History, 87(2), 228–247.
- Penkower, M. (1987). Eleanor Roosevelt and the Plight of World Jewry. Jewish Social Studies, 49(2), pp. 125–136.
- Pfeffer, P. (1996). Eleanor Roosevelt and the National and World Woman's Parties. The Historian, 59(1), pp. 39–57.
- Roemer, K. (2005). The Multi-Missionary Eleanor Roosevelt of American Indian Literatures. Studies in American Indian Literatures, 17(2), pp. 101–105.
- Seeber, F. (1990). Eleanor Roosevelt and Women in the New Deal: A Network of Friends. Presidential Studies Quarterly, 20(4), pp. 707–717.
- Urdang, I. (2008). Franklin and Eleanor Roosevelt: Human Rights and the Creation of the United Nations. OAH Magazine of History, 22(2), pp. 28–31.
- Watson, Robert P. (1997) "The first lady reconsidered: Presidential partner and political institution." Presidential Studies Quarterly 27 (1997): 805+ online
- Winfield, B. (1988). "Anna Eleanor Roosevelt's White House Legacy: The Public First Lady". Presidential Studies Quarterly, 18(2), pp. 331–345. online
- Winfield, B. (1990). The Legacy of Eleanor Roosevelt. Presidential Studies Quarterly, 20(4), pp. 699–706.
- The First Eleanor Roosevelt International Caucus of Women Political Leaders. (1988). Signs, 13(2), pp. 372–373.

== Primary sources written by Eleanor Roosevelt ==
- 1933 – It's Up to the Women. New York: Frederick A. Stokes Company
- 1935 – A Trip to Washington With Bobby And Betty. New York: Dodge
- 1937 – This is my story. New York: Bantam Books. First part autobiography
- 1940 – Christmas. A Story. New York: Knopf
- 1949 – This I Remember, New York: Harper & Bros. Second part autobiography
- 1953 – UN: today and tomorrow. New York: Harper & Brothers. Co-author: William DeWitt
- 1953 – India and the awakening East. New York: Harper & Brothers
- 1958 – On My Own, New York: Harper & Bros. Third part autobiography
- 1962 – Eleanor Roosevelt's Book of Common Sense Etiquette. New York: The Macmillan Company
- 1963 – Tomorrow is now. New York: Harper & Row. Published posthumously
- Knepper, C. D. (2004). Dear Mrs. Roosevelt: Letters to Eleanor Roosevelt Through Depression and War. New York: Carroll & Graf.
- Roosevelt, E., & Beasley, M. (1983). The White House Press Conference of Eleanor Roosevelt. New York: Garland. (Note: Collection of 84 transcripts for the White House press conferences of Eleanor Roosevelt and her two statements of the press. Covers period from March 6, 1933 – April 12, 1945.)
- Roosevelt, E., & Black, A. M. (2007). The Eleanor Roosevelt Papers, Vol. 1: The Human Rights Years, 1945–1948. Detroit: Thomson Gale.
- Roosevelt, E., & Black, A. M. (2012). The Eleanor Roosevelt Papers, Vol. 2: The Human Rights Years, 1949–1952. Detroit: Thomson Gale.
- Black, A. M. (2000). Courage in a Dangerous World: The Political Writings of Eleanor Roosevelt. New York: Columbia University Press.
- Roosevelt, E., & Black, A. M. (2007). The Eleanor Roosevelt Papers. Detroit: Charles Scribner's Sons.
- Roosevelt, E., & Roosevelt, I. N. (2014). The Autobiography of Eleanor Roosevelt. New York: Harper Perennial.

== See also ==
- Bibliography of United States presidential spouses and first ladies
