= Maurice Howe Richardson =

American surgeon (1851–1912)

Maurice Howe Richardson (31 December 1851, Athol, Massachusetts – 2 August 1912) was an American surgeon.

== Early life ==
While a student in Fitchburg, Massachusetts, he was a student of Eliza Trask Hill. He qualified MD at Harvard Medical School in 1877.

== Career ==
Richardson was appointed Moseley Professor of Surgery at Harvard Medical School in 1907 and Surgeon-in-Chief at Massachusetts General Hospital, where he specialized in abdominal surgery.

He was a Fellow and frequent contributor to the proceedings of the Massachusetts Medical Society. He also was a member of the American Medical Association, the American Surgical Association, and many other professional societies.

He is remembered as inventor of the Richardson abdominal retractor. His collaboration with Reginald Heber Fitz led to great improvements in the treatment of appendicitis.

His papers are part of the part of the Center for the History of Medicine (Francis A. Countway Library of Medicine) Repository, Harvard University.

== Personal life ==
Richardson married Margaret White Peirson in July 1879; they had six children. The six children were Edward Peirson, Mary Tuckerman, Maurice Howe, Henry Barber, Margaret, and Wyman Richardson. The eldest son Edward Peirson Richardson (1881–1944) became a noted physician and father of the lawyer Elliot Richardson. Mary Tuckerman Richardson (1882–1953) married Robert Walcott in 1907. Maurice Howe Richardson, II (1886–1961) became an insurance broker. Henry B. Richardson won two Olympic bronze medals and graduated from Harvard University in 1910. Margaret Richardson married Hall Roosevelt. Wyman Richardson (1896–1953) became a physician and noted author.
