= Helen Dauvray =

American actress

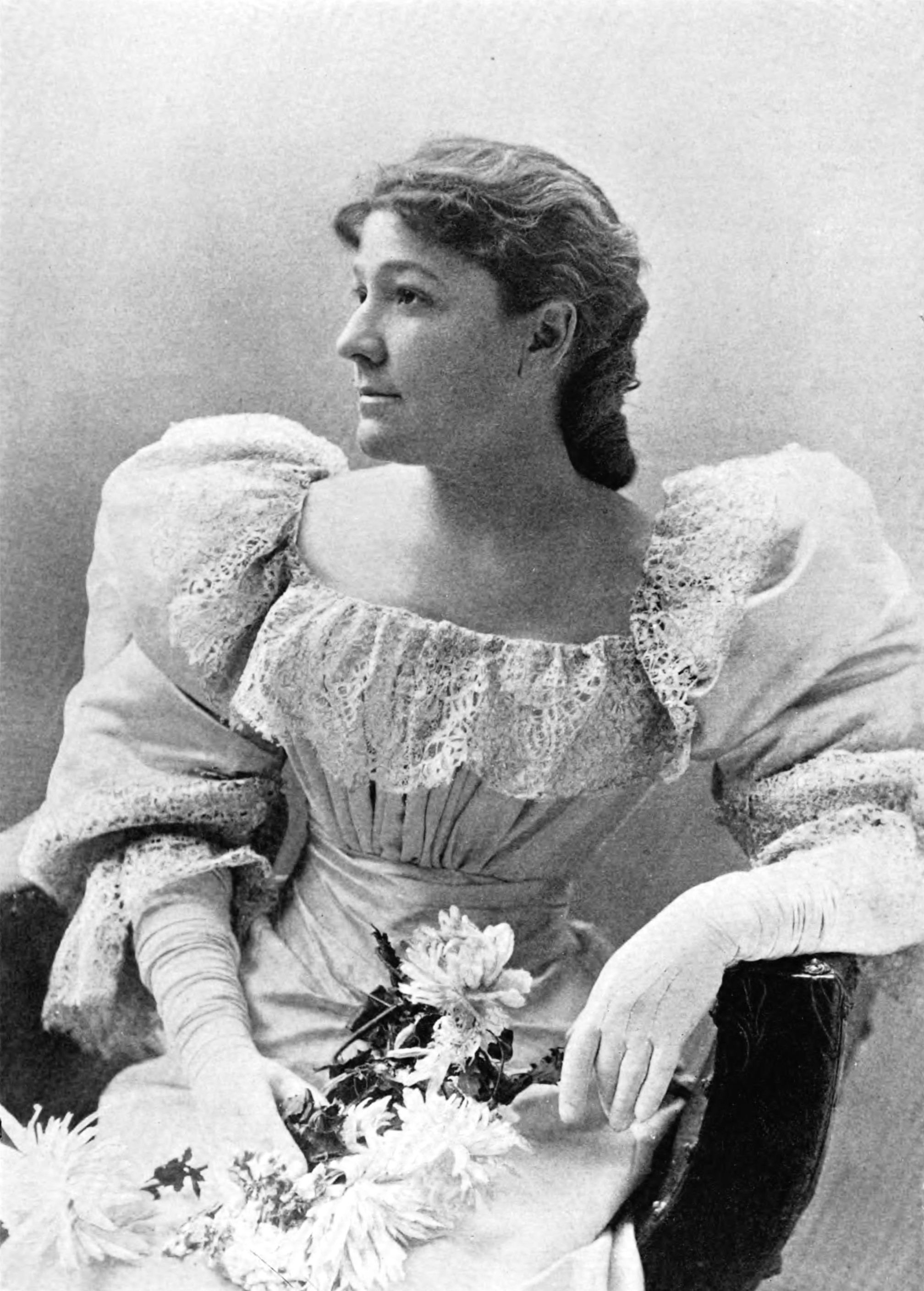
Helen Dauvray, 1896

Helen Dauvray (February 14, 1859 – December 6, 1923) was an American actress. She was a star in Bronson Howard's play One of Our Girls (1885), among others.

== Biography ==
Dauvray was born on February 14, 1859, in San Francisco, California. She married baseball player John Montgomery Ward on October 12, 1887. They divorced, though a trophy called the "Dauvray Cup" was created during their union in 1887 and awarded until 1893. Books about baseball history recount the details of their celebrity marriage.

In 1896 she married Admiral Albert G. Winterhalter. She died on December 6, 1923, in Washington, D.C. She was buried at Arlington National Cemetery with her husband.

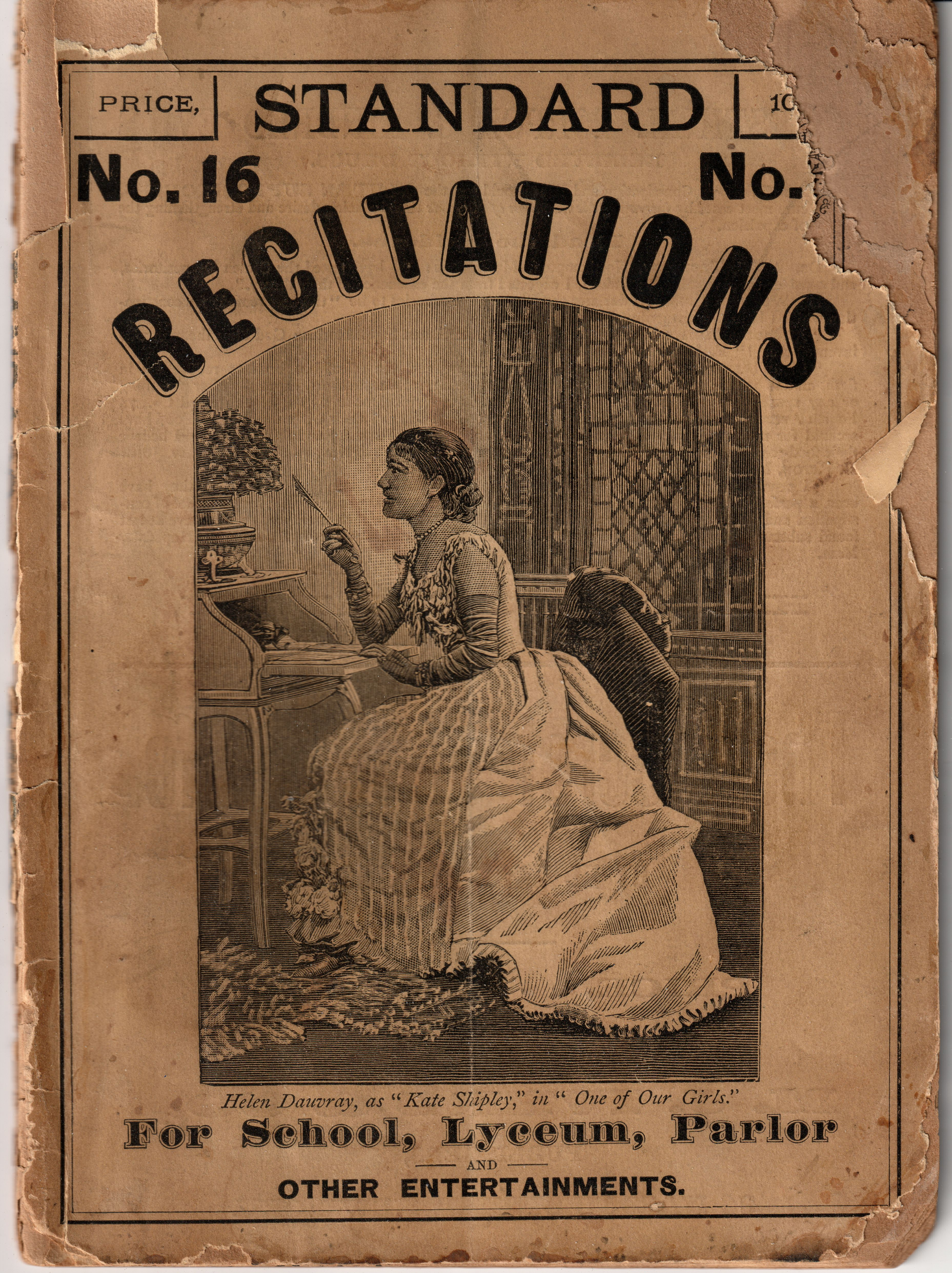
Illustrated on a 19th-century booklet of recitations
