= John Tonnelé =

American politician

Member of the New Jersey Senate for Hudson County
- In office January 11, 1848 – March 2, 1849
- Preceded by: Richard Outwater
- Succeeded by: John Cassedy

Personal details
- Born: 1807 New York City, New York, U.S.
- Died: November 26, 1852 (aged 44–45)
- Parent(s): John Tonnelé Sr. Rebecca Waterbury Tonnelé

John Tonnelé Jr. (1807 – November 26, 1852) was an American farmer and politician who was the first Roman Catholic member of the New Jersey Legislature.

== Early life ==
Tonnelé was born in New York City in 1807. He was the son of Rebecca (née Waterbury) Tonnelé (d. 1858) and John Tonnelé Sr. (d. 1846), a French born merchant and senior partner with the New York wool firm of Tonnele & Hall, which was considered "the most extensive Wool dealers in the country" in 1842. His sister, Susan (née Tonnelé) Hall, was married to Valentine Gill Hall, an Irish immigrant, and they were the parents of Valentine Hall Jr. who married Mary Livingston Ludlow in a marriage that "... united a member of a prominent New York merchantile family with Hudson River gentry".

His maternal grandfather was Revolutionary War General David How Waterbury Jr. of Stamford, Connecticut.

== Career ==
In 1835, Tonnelé relocated to New Jersey and purchased a large tract of land near Hudson City.

He served three terms on the Hudson County Board of Chosen Freeholders in 1844, 1846 and 1847. Tonnele represented Hudson County in the New Jersey Senate for one term from 1848 to 1849.

== Personal life ==
Tonnelé, who was married to Cecile, was the father of eight children, including:

- John Laurent Tonnelé (d. 1901), a Union Army officer in the Civil War with the 2nd New Jersey Militia.
- Julie Emelie Tonnelé (d. 1880), who married Francis G. Wetmore.
- Cecile Josephine Tonnelé (d. 1874), who also married a Wetmore.
- Laurencine Salles Tonnelé (d. 1881), who married a Deegan, a Gedney and a McDonald.
- Adelaide Jane Tonnelé (d. 1922), who married Francis William Mitchell.
- Margaret Tonnelé (d. 1907), who married Joseph Longinotto in 1864. After his death, she remarried to a Ginocchio.
- Eloise Tonnelé (d. 1883), who married Albert Gedney.
- Isabella Zedina Tonnelé (d. 1874), who did not marry.

Tonnelé died on November 26, 1852, and his widow died in January 1868. His will stipulated that the children of his son should have the income from the property he left and that the grandchildren should have the property on their death, however, it was broken by his daughter, and her position was eventually upheld by the Court of Appeals. Through his only son, he was the grandfather of Laurent J. Tonnelé (d. 1933).

== Legacy ==
He is recalled in the namesake Tonnele Avenue and Tonnele Circle.
