= Anna Hall Roosevelt =

Mother of American First Lady Eleanor Roosevelt (1863–1892)

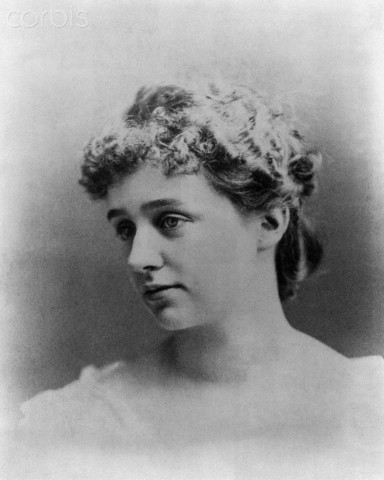
- Roosevelt in the 1880s
- Born: Anna Rebecca Hall; March 17, 1863; New York City, U.S.
- Died: December 7, 1892 (aged 29); New York City, U.S.
- Spouse: Elliott Roosevelt (m. 1883)
- Children: Eleanor; Elliott Jr.; Hall
- Parent(s): Valentine Gill Hall Jr. Mary Livingston Ludlow
- Relatives: See Livingston family and Roosevelt family

Anna Rebecca Hall Roosevelt (March 17, 1863 – December 7, 1892) was an American socialite. She was the mother of First Lady of the United States, Eleanor Roosevelt, and was described as a celebrated beauty.

== Early life ==
Anna Rebecca Hall was born on March 17, 1863. She was the eldest of seven children born to Valentine Gill Hall Jr. and Mary Livingston Ludlow of the Livingston family. Their marriage "...united a member of a prominent New York mercantile family with Hudson River gentry". Anna was born in New York City and was a granddaughter of Edward Hunter Ludlow.

Her brothers, Valentine III and Edward, were both tennis champions and, later, alcoholics who spent beyond their means and inheritances. Anna's four sisters were Elizabeth, Mary, Edith, and Maude. Her father died without leaving a will when Anna was 17, and she was forced to take control of the family and help manage the finances.

Anna was one of the leading debutantes of the 1881 season. A prominent figure among the New York City social elite, she was a skilled horsewoman. It is believed that Anna and Elliott Roosevelt, the brother of future President Theodore Roosevelt, became engaged Memorial Day, 1883, at a house party given by their friend, Laura Delano, at Algonac, the Delano estate on the Hudson River at Newburgh, New York. At the time, Anna was living at Oak Terrace, her family's estate far upriver at Tivoli, New York.

== Married life ==
On December 1, 1883, she married Elliott Roosevelt in Calvary Church at Gramercy Park in New York City. The couple moved into a brownstone house in the fashionable East Thirties. Anna and Elliott had three children:

- Anna Eleanor Roosevelt (1884–1962)
- Elliott Roosevelt Jr. (1889–1893)
- Gracie Hall Roosevelt (1891–1941).

Anna Roosevelt was responsible for numerous social events and charity balls. Her brother-in-law Theodore considered her frivolous. At the time of their marriage on December 1, 1883, Elliott was already known as a heavy drinker addicted to laudanum. Often subject to headaches and depressions, Anna was somewhat ashamed of her daughter Eleanor's plainness and nicknamed Eleanor "Granny", due to the child's serious demeanor.

In the spring of 1887, the family sailed to Europe aboard the ocean liner SS Britannic. One day out of port, their ship was rammed by the SS Celtic, the bow of which pierced a full 10 feet (3.0 m) into the side of the Britannic, killing several passengers and injuring numerous others. The Roosevelt party was evacuated to lifeboats before continuing their voyage aboard another ocean liner. Upon their return, Elliott commenced construction of his Long Island country residence, Half Way Nirvana. Parties at their estate included polo and riding-to-hounds.

In 1889, after the birth of their second child, Elliott's drinking only increased, and the family traveled to Austria in search of treatment. After three months, they moved to Paris, where Anna's third child, a son, (Gracie) Hall, was born. The marriage teetered on collapse during their time in France. Soon afterward, Anna and Elliott separated.

When Eleanor was eight, Anna contracted diphtheria and died at age 29 at her home, 52 East 61st Street in Manhattan. Elliott died at his home, 313 West 102 Street on August 14, 1894, from a seizure after a suicide attempt and the cumulative effects of alcoholism. The remains of both Anna and Elliott are interred in the Hall family vault at the cemetery of St. Paul's Episcopal Church in Tivoli.

Anna's daughter, Eleanor, would go on to become First Lady of the United States, and her husband Elliott's fifth cousin, Franklin Delano Roosevelt, became President of the United States in March 1933.

== See also ==
- Bibliography of Eleanor Roosevelt
- Livingston family
- Roosevelt family

== Sources ==
- Goodwin, Doris Kearns (1994). No Ordinary Time. Simon & Schuster. ISBN 978-0-684-80448-4.
