= Old Naval Hospital =

- U.S. National Register of Historic Places
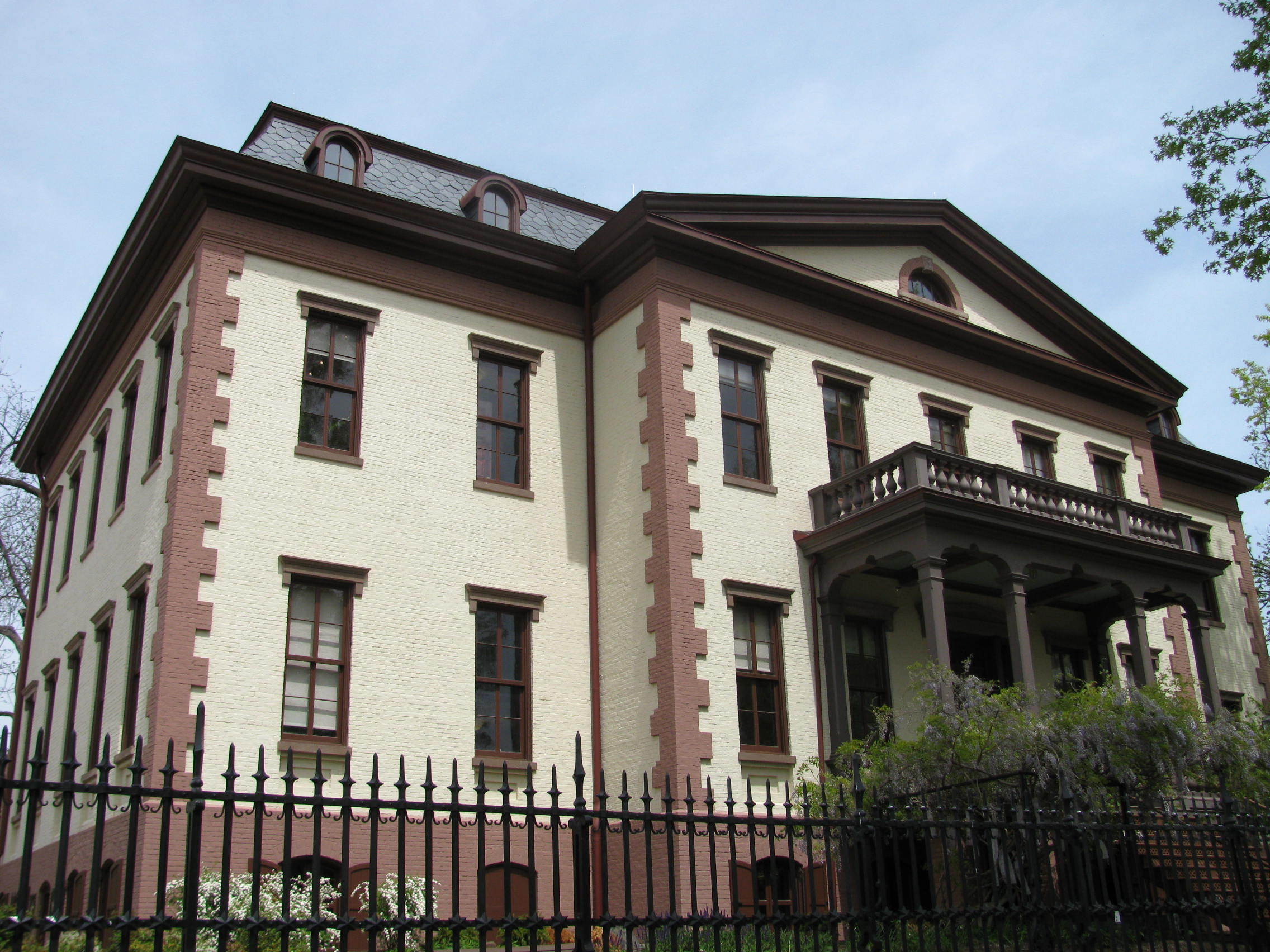

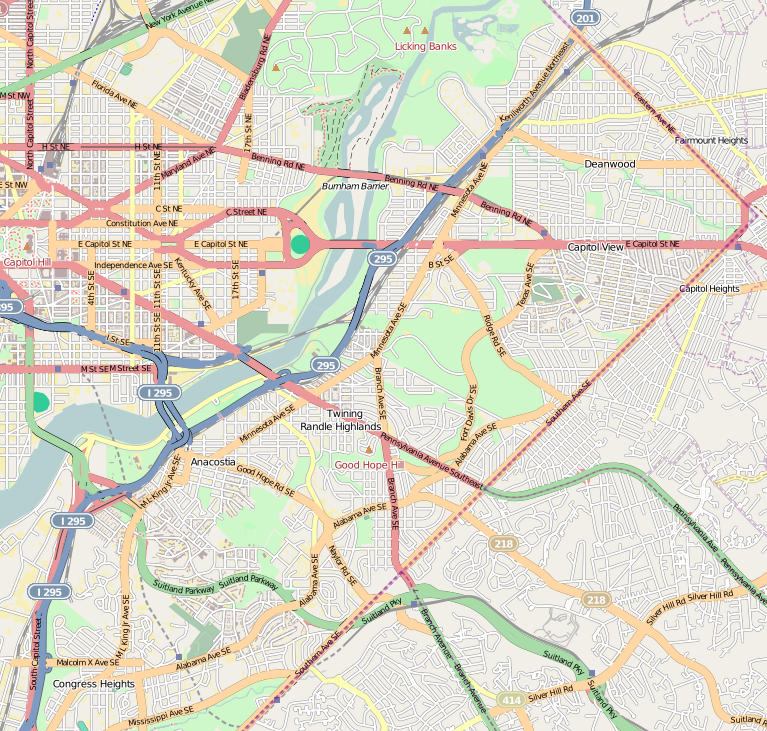
- Location within Washington, D.C. Location within the District of Columbia Location within the United States
- Location: 8th and E Street, SE; Washington, D.C. United States
- Coordinates: 38°52′58.8″N 76°59′35.16″W
- Built: 1866
- Architectural style: Italianate
- NRHP reference No.: 74002171
- Added to NRHP: May 3, 1974

The Old Naval Hospital is a historic building located at 921 Pennsylvania Avenue, Southeast Washington, D.C., in the Capitol Hill neighborhood.

== History ==
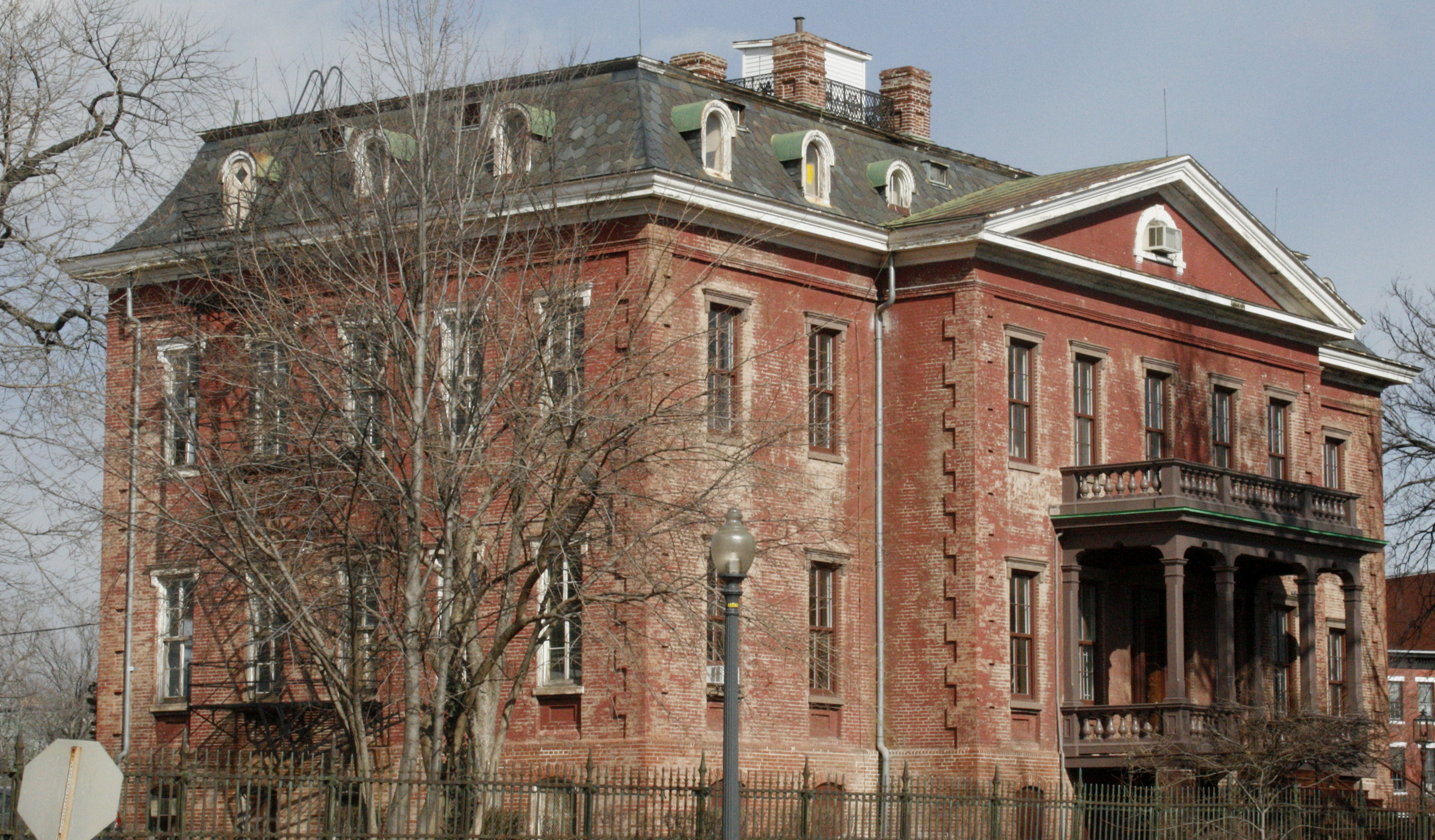
In 2008, before restoration

In March 1864, president Abraham Lincoln asked Congress to construct the hospital. It was constructed in July 1866, for $115,000. Designed to accommodate 50 patients, the new hospital had good ventilation, running water, and gas lighting.

In 1906, the hospital moved to its new facility at Observatory Hill, 23rd Street, and E Streets, N.W.

In 1922, the building became the Temporary Home for Veterans of All Wars. The property is still owned by the federal government but its jurisdiction was transferred to the District of Columbia in 1962. The building was vacant for many years.

In 2000 DC Mayor Anthony A. Williams formed a commission to establish an official mayoral residence with a renovation of the Old Naval Hospital being one of the options considered. Ultimately the commission recommended a plan for a new building to be constructed in Foxhall to become the mayoral residence, however, this plan fell apart by 2003.

The Friends of the Old Naval Hospital has raised money to restore the building, at an estimated cost of $12 million. The plan is for the Hill Center to be a facility for education and community life on Capitol Hill. Restoration started in June 2010.

On November 19, 2011, the Old Naval Hospital was reopened as a community centre called Hill Center. The new centre offers programs and opportunities to engage more in the community.
