= Elliott Roosevelt (socialite) =

Father-in-law of Franklin D. Roosevelt

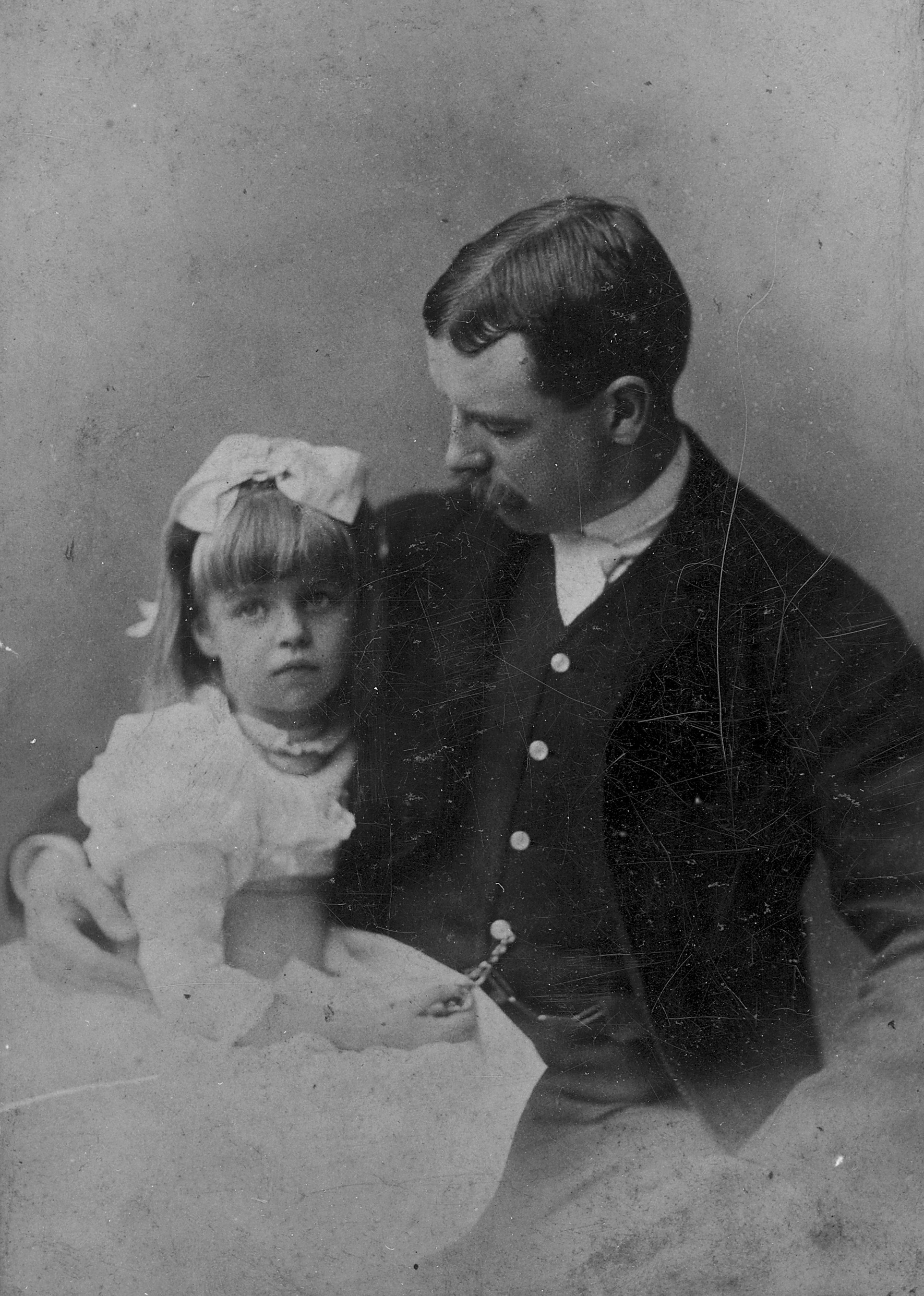
- Roosevelt with his daughter Eleanor in 1889
- Born: February 28, 1860; New York City, New York, U.S
- Died: August 14, 1894 (aged 34)
- Education: St Paul's School
- Known for: Brother of Theodore and father of Eleanor Roosevelt
- Spouse: Anna Rebecca Hall (m. 1883; died 1892)
- Children: 4, including Eleanor and Hall
- Parent(s): Theodore Roosevelt Sr. Martha Stewart Bulloch
- Family: See Roosevelt family

Elliott Roosevelt Sr. (February 28, 1860 – August 14, 1894) was an American socialite. He was the father of First Lady Eleanor Roosevelt (1884–1962) and the younger brother of Theodore Roosevelt (1858–1919), the 26th president of the United States. Elliott and Theodore were of the Oyster Bay Roosevelts; Eleanor later married her Hyde Park distant cousin Franklin Delano Roosevelt (1882–1945), the 32nd President.

== Youth ==
Elliott Roosevelt was born in Flatiron District, Manhattan, New York City at 28 East 20th Street on February 28th, 1860. He is the third of the four children of Theodore Roosevelt Sr. (1831–1878) and Martha Stewart "Mittie" Bulloch (1835–1884). In addition to elder brother Theodore Jr., he had a younger sister named Corinne (1861–1933) and an elder sister named Anna (1855–1931), who was known as "Bamie".

As an Oyster Bay Roosevelt, and through his ancestor Cornelius Van Schaack Jr., Elliott was a descendant of the Schuyler family.

Roosevelt with his brother Theodore in 1880

At a young age, Elliott was academically more successful than Theodore and had a competitive relationship with his older brother; however, he eventually was surpassed by his older brother. This competition continued into the next generation with their own daughters. Elliott enrolled at St Paul's School in Concord, New Hampshire in September 1875. He performed well academically though he soon had to withdraw and return home after unexpectedly falling ill. Elliott maintained a charming and winsome personality all his life, which masked a growing drinking problem that started at a young age.

== Hunting trips to Texas ==
In 1876 and 1877, young Roosevelt made two hunting trips into West Texas. The first journey ignited his interest in the wilderness. In his second trip, the 16-year-old Elliott was accompanied by a cousin, 23-year-old John Roosevelt. The two traveled first to Dallas and planned to hunt bison in the area between Waxahachie, Texas and Houston, Texas. They also intended to spend some time at Fort McKavett in Menard County. Once in Dallas, however, their plans changed after they met a group of other young men, one of whom was the sportsman Andrew Jameson, whose family made a fortune in Irish whiskey. These young men talked Elliott and John into going directly to West Texas to hunt bison.

On January 2, 1877, the group of eight men left Dallas. By mid-January, they were at a location just west of Graham, Texas where they listened to "the panther and wolves crying and howling" and kept their firearms within easy reach. Roosevelt wrote: "It is a glorious free life," so exciting that he did not grow homesick. The party passed through Fort Griffin, Texas, where they found in abundance bison, deer, antelope, quail, wild turkeys, and rabbits. When they cooked their game, the scent attracted unwanted guests of wolves and panthers.

On February 3, Roosevelt entered into his diary: "[We] made our permanent camp at the bottom of a huge canyon by a fine water hole." They were probably at the time in southern Crosby County, Texas, some 40 miles east of Lubbock, Texas. After 300 miles of travel, the party soon found hunting bison to be most hazardous. Elliott and John at one point faced a herd of bison stampeding toward them. They waited until the bison were in close range before they fired their weapons. A near-fatal incident took place when Elliott was charged by a huge bull, which he had wounded. He barely could reload his rifle in time to fire a shot that struck one of the front legs of a bison. The animal crashed to the ground directly in front of Elliott.

When raiders, either other buffalo hunters or the Comanche, stole most of their horses, they had to walk the 140 miles back to Fort Griffin. In other diary entries, Elliott wrote: "Trails bad-freezing night no water...Again only mud no water freezing hard...Fright ful [sic] thirst." They reached Fort Griffin on George Washington's birthday and a week later returned to Dallas. Then, Elliott and John resumed their originally planned route. They were back in New York in late May 1877.

== Personal life ==
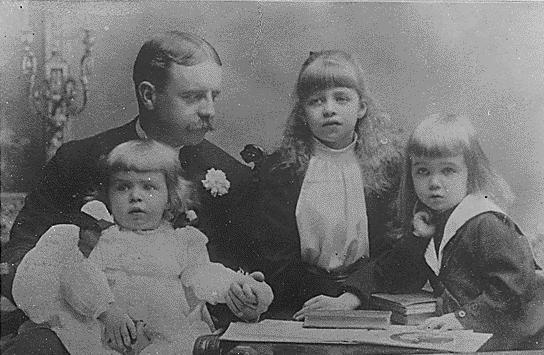
Roosevelt with his children (from left to right) Hall, Eleanor, and Elliott Jr.

On his father's death in 1878, Roosevelt inherited a fortune and lived the lifestyle of the idle rich by, among other pursuits, hunting tigers in India.

On October 27, 1880, Elliott served as best man at Theodore's first marriage to Alice Hathaway Lee. In 1883, Roosevelt wed a rich debutante, Anna Rebecca Hall (1863–1892), the eldest daughter of Valentine Gill Hall Jr., and Mary Livingston Ludlow. The wedding was held on December 1, 1883 in Calvary Church in New York City. The couple had three children:

- Anna Eleanor Roosevelt (October 11, 1884 – November 7, 1962), called Eleanor
- Elliott Roosevelt Jr. (September 29, 1889 – May 25, 1893), who died from diphtheria
- Gracie Hall Roosevelt (June 28, 1891 – September 25, 1941), called Hall

After this point, Elliott Sr. developed a "casual drinking" problem, which soon became alcoholism, an affliction to which his son Hall later succumbed as well.

Because of his drinking problem, Elliott was exiled to Abingdon, Virginia, where he constantly wrote letters, mostly to Eleanor. Eleanor later recalled that on his many horseback riding expeditions with the young children in Virginia, he became attached to "one girl in particular of whom I was jealous." On occasion, he would, to the jubilation of Eleanor, return home for a few days.

Elliott fathered a son with a young servant girl named Katy Mann employed by Anna. His brother sent a detective who specialized in likenesses to look at the child and subsequently the Roosevelts settled out of court for $10,000. The sum was placed in a trust, but according to the Manns, the child never received a dime as the money apparently was looted by Katy's lawyers. There was some correspondence between Eleanor Roosevelt and her half-brother Elliott Roosevelt Mann (1891–1976).

Theodore Roosevelt had Elliott forcibly removed from his home in 1891. This was done in the presence of Elliott's children. Elliott referred to this action as a "kidnapping". Elliott then went to Europe. Theodore Roosevelt and his sister Anna (Anna "Bamie" Roosevelt Cowles) conspired to have Elliott separated from his family. They told Elliott's wife Anna (Anna Rebecca Hall Roosevelt) about his "lovechild", and they arranged for her and her children to return home to the United States while Elliott remained in Europe. Elliott was then institutionalized under a doctor's care in a sanitarium. Theodore Roosevelt acted as the conservator for his brother's estate.

After having been institutionalized in Europe, Elliott Roosevelt was able to arrange his return to the United States, where he was able to undergo formal evaluation. He was declared sane and mentally competent by two different courts, and thus Theodore Roosevelt failed to gain official conservatorship over his brother. However, Theodore was able to use his power to keep Elliott separated from his family, thus preventing Elliott from visiting his children.

== Death ==
Things got worse for Elliott when, later in 1892, his wife Anna died. Their son Elliott Jr. died the next year from scarlet fever. Elliott's drinking became worse as he became despondent over both the loss of his wife and son, and the fact he still wasn’t allowed to see his remaining children.

After losing his family in this manner, Roosevelt’s alcoholism and depression became progressively worse. On August 13, 1894, the 34-year-old Roosevelt attempted suicide by jumping out a window; he survived the initial fall, but the following day he suffered a seizure and died that evening of heart failure. At the time of his death, his alcoholism had escalated such that he was consuming numerous bottles of champagne and brandy each day.

== See also ==
- Bibliography of Eleanor Roosevelt
- Roosevelt family
