= Charles Banks Wilson =

American painter

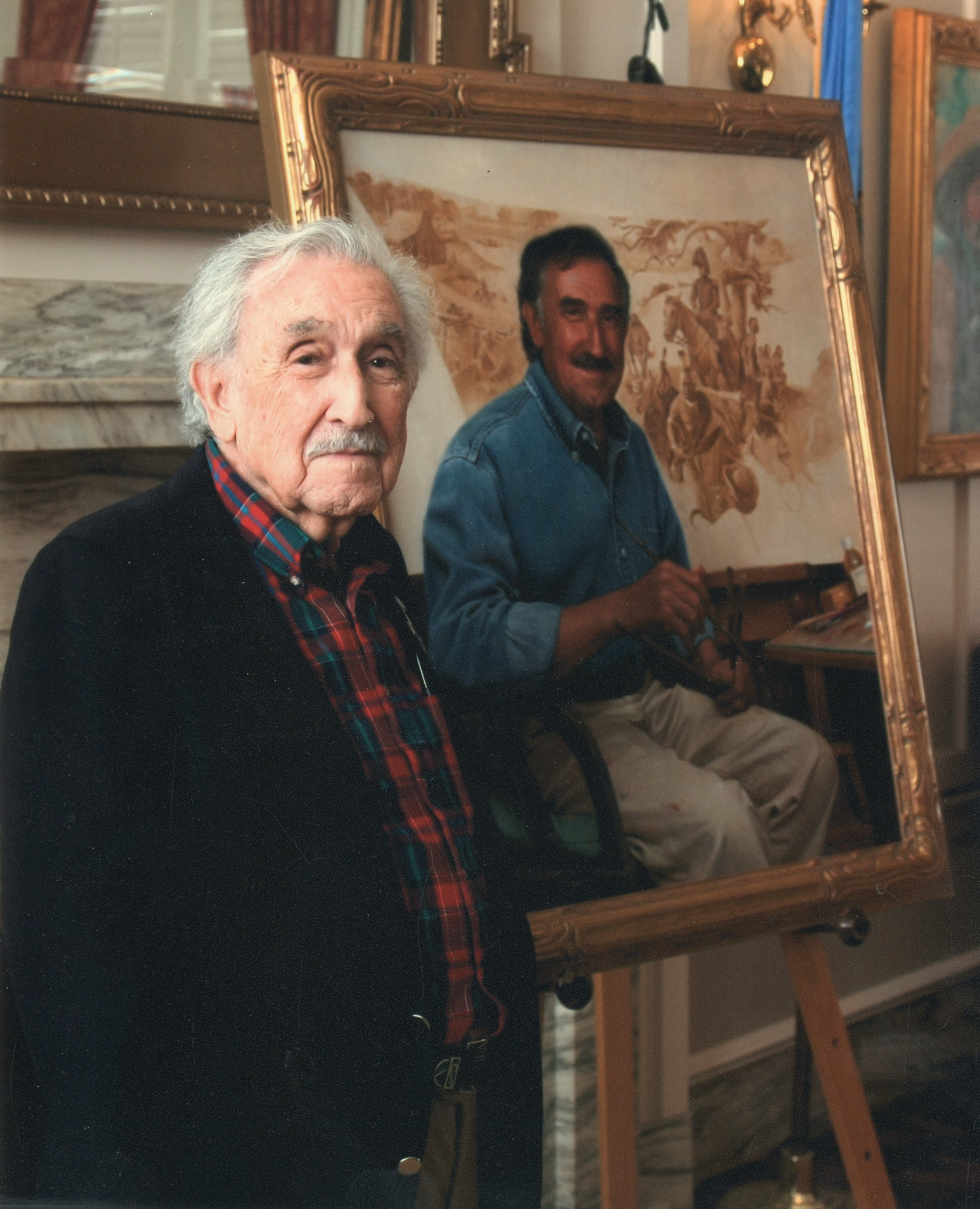
- Born: August 6, 1918; Springdale, Arkansas
- Died: May 2, 2013 (aged 94); Rogers, Arkansas
- Education: Art Institute of Chicago
- Known for: Painting

Charles Banks Wilson (August 6, 1918 – May 2, 2013) was an American artist. Wilson was born in Springdale, Arkansas in 1918; his family eventually moved to Miami, Oklahoma, where he spent his childhood. A painter, printmaker, teacher, lecturer, historian, magazine and book illustrator, Wilson's work has been shown in over 200 exhibitions in the United States and across the globe.

Permanent collections of Wilson's work are housed in some of the most renowned museums and art galleries in the world. These include New York's Metropolitan Museum, Washington's Library of Congress, the Corcoran Gallery and the Smithsonian. Works by Wilson are a prominent feature of the Oklahoma State Capitol.

== History ==
Wilson enrolled in the Art Institute of Chicago in 1937 to study painting, watercolor and lithography. He obtained an apprenticeship as an illustrator at the Chicago Tribune, and contributed to a folio for the American Art Association. Many of Wilson’s works hang in the Oklahoma State Capitol including life-size portraits of Will Rogers, Sequoyah, Jim Thorpe and Senator Robert Kerr. Four other murals depicting the early history of Oklahoma also hang under the Capitol dome.

In addition to being the author and editor of a standard work on the Indian Tribes of Eastern Oklahoma, he is also the illustrator of 22 books and has contributed illustrations to many more.

Wilson was a good friend of the Missouri painter Thomas Hart Benton, and assisted Benton in his search for suitable Native Americans to sketch in Oklahoma. These Pawnee and Seneca tribespeople were included in Benton's mural at the Harry S. Truman Presidential Library, Independence and the Opening of the West. Wilson also created a color lithograph depicting the interior of Benton's studio, a portrait of Benton, and a life-size bronze sculpture, now on the grounds of the Kansas City Art Institute.

Children attending Oklahoma schools studied from a history textbook that contained over 50 of his drawings. His works include prize-winning books such as the classic Treasure Island, Company of Adventurers, Henry's Lincoln, and Mustangs. Writers have said that the paintings by Charles Banks Wilson breathe the spirit of the southwest. Commissioned by John D. Rockefeller Jr. in 1955, Wilson's mural "The Trapper's Bride" is among the most superb records of the American West's fur trade.

Wilson's famous portrait sitters include U.S. House Speaker Carl Albert, whose portrait is the first to hang in the National Portrait Gallery in Washington, D.C., prior to permanent installation in the U.S. Capitol Speaker's Gallery. The four mural-sized portraits of Will Rogers, the Cherokee scholar Sequoyah, U.S. Senator Robert Kerr, and athlete Jim Thorpe are viewed by over a million visitors per year at the Oklahoma Capitol. He is best known for his pictures of contemporary Indian life. The "Ten Little Indians" portfolio created by Wilson has been reproduced in every country in the world.

Honored by the U.S. State Department as well as the International Institute of Arts and Letters in Geneva, Charles Banks Wilson received the first Governor's Art Award and the D.S.C. (Distinguished Service Citation ) from the University of Oklahoma. Wilson is also honored in the Oklahoma Hall of Fame, received the Western Heritage award from the Cowboy Hall of Fame.

Wilson created the designs for "The First American Series", basalt medallions depicting famous Indian chiefs, which were produced by Josiah Wedgwood and Sons, Inc., England. One major undertaking was creating the murals for the Oklahoma Capitol, which depict the state's discovery, frontier trade, Indian immigration, settlement, and overall history. These murals total 110 feet (34 m) in length.

Wilson established the Art Department at Northeastern Oklahoma A&M College, which he chaired for 15 years; and the Charles Banks Wilson Scholarship has helped many young artists who have wanted to study there.

Wilson was a Fellow of the International Institution of Arts and Letters, a member of the Oklahoma Hall of Fame and is the recipient of the Lifetime Achievement Award from the Arkansas Arts Council. He was also awarded the Oklahoma Governor’s Art Award and was the subject of a documentary titled ‘Portrait of an American Artist.’

In 1995 Wilson painted "Freedom's Warrior", which commemorates the history of Native American involvement in the U.S. armed forces, and their contributions to our country in times of war or peace. Commissioned by David W. Hearn Jr., and currently on loan to the Clifton Steamboat Museum in Beaumont, Texas. The painting was loaned to the museum to highlight its collection of Mr. Wilson's work.

May 9, 2007 “Charles Banks Wilson Day” was confirmed by the Oklahoma House of Representatives and the Oklahoma State Senate.

The NEO Foundation recently renovated the Charles Banks Wilson Art Gallery at NEO as a way to honor his contributions to the college. The 15,000-square-foot (1,400 m^{2}) space will include a student gallery, classrooms, studio space, computer-graphic design studio and faculty offices.

Wilson died in his sleep at the age of 94 on May 2, 2013.
