= Mary Paxton Keeley =

American journalist (1886–1986)

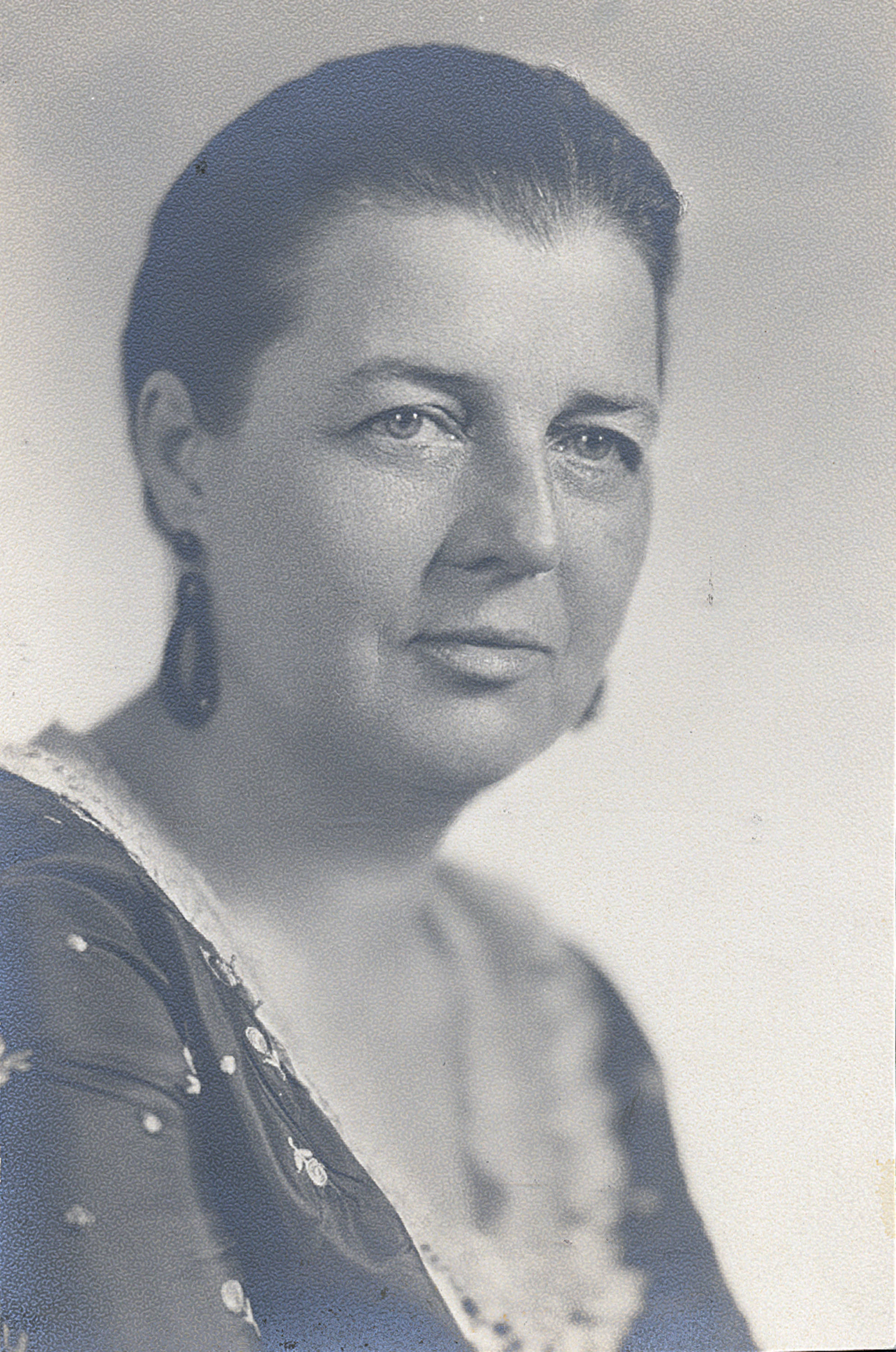
- Born: Mary Gentry Paxton; June 2, 1886; Independence, Missouri, US
- Died: December 6, 1986 (aged 100); Columbia, Missouri, US
- Education: Missouri School of Journalism
- Spouse: Edmund Burke Keeley (m. 1918; died 1928)

Mary Gentry Paxton Keeley (June 2, 1886 – December 6, 1986) was an American journalist. Born in Independence, Missouri, she grew up next door to Bess Wallace, future wife of President Harry S. Truman, and the two became close friends. Following her mother's early death from tuberculosis, she graduated from Manual Training High School and studied first at Hollins College and the University of Chicago, before joining the first class of the Missouri School of Journalism in 1907. While studying there, she was romantically involved with one of her teachers and childhood friends, Charles Ross, whom she intended to marry. Paxton graduated in 1910, the program's first female graduate and, according to the dean, "the first woman in all the world to hold a degree in journalism".

Shortly after graduating, she began working for the Kansas City Post, as one of the first female reporters in Kansas City, Missouri. She left the position after fifteen months when she fell ill with appendicitis and, when her engagement to Ross broke off, she briefly moved to Greenville, Mississippi, to stay with cousins. She was encouraged by Walter Williams, the dean of the Missouri School of Journalism, to study home economics journalism at the University of Chicago and lived in Alabama and Virginia, where she worked for 4-H clubs and as a home demonstration agent. Paxton moved to France to work in the canteens with the YMCA during World War I.

At the end of the war, Paxton married Edmund Burke Keeley and the couple had one son, John Gallatin Paxton Keeley, in 1921. Her husband fell ill two years later and she worked as a home extension agent in Holt County, Missouri, and then as a reporter for the Atchison County Mail. After his death, she received her master's degree in journalism and joined Christian College (now Columbia College) as a journalism instructor and founder of the student newspaper, The Microphone. She remained an active writer, publishing the children's book River Gold in 1928 and writing several plays which were performed locally. In 1952, she retired from teaching and became an amateur genealogist, photographer, and painter. She died in 1986 at the age of 100.

== Early life ==
Paxton was born Mary Gentry Paxton on June 2, 1886, in Independence, Missouri. Her father was John Gallatin Paxton, a lawyer, and her mother was Mary Neil Gentry, an elocution teacher. Her paternal grandfather was military officer Elisha F. Paxton, making her the great-aunt of actor Bill Paxton, while her maternal great-grandparents were Ann Hawkins Gentry and Richard Gentry. Her mother was an early graduate of the University of Missouri who established the Mary Paxton Study Class in 1895, where local women gathered to study languages, history, and literature. Her paternal uncle, Matthew White Paxton, was a journalist who published the Rockbridge County News and her maternal aunt was Sarah Jane "Sally" Gentry, the second woman to graduate from the University of Missouri in 1873. Paxton was the eldest of five children, including her brothers Frank, Matthew, and Edward, and her sister Elizabeth.

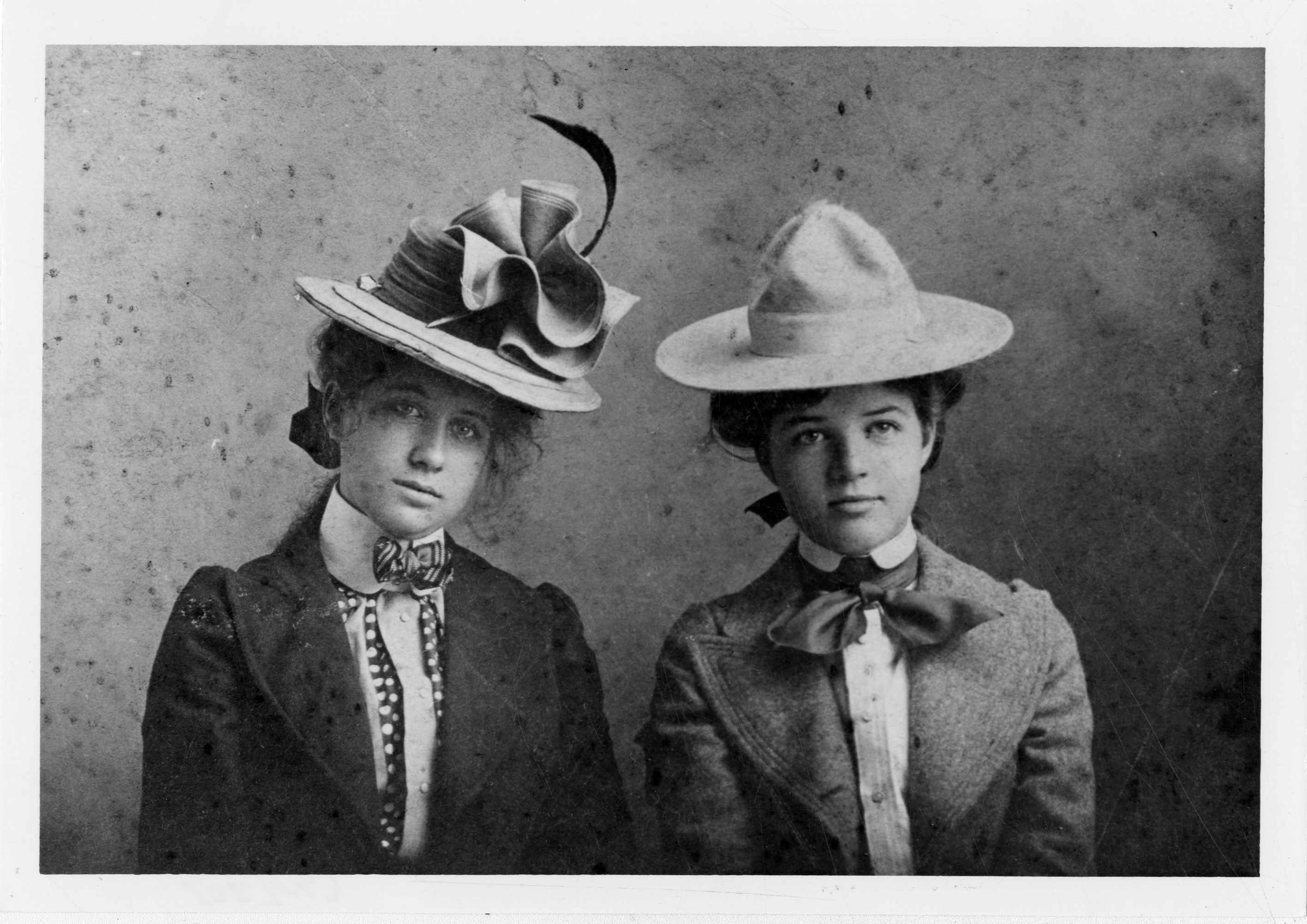
Paxton (right) with her childhood friend Bess Wallace in 1901

Paxton was the childhood friend of Bess Wallace, future wife of President Harry S. Truman. She grew up at 614 North Delaware Street, next door to Wallace, and the friends attended dance classes and founded a YWCA basketball team, coached by Phog Allen, with other local girls. There were twenty-four other children on the street and they often socialized. In the town's hierarchy, as later recalled by Paxton, the Presbyterians had the top social status, followed by the Disciples of Christ, Methodists, Baptists and Lutherans. Paxton and Wallace attended the Presbyterian church. Paxton attended the Presbyterian Ladies College for kindergarten, before being transferred to the public Ott School, where Wallace was also a student. Their social group was very focused on proper etiquette and the girls would not date the boys in the group for fear of being ostracized. While Paxton was in grammar school, her mother fell ill with tuberculosis and moved to Colorado for three years to recover, leaving the family in Independence. As the eldest daughter, Paxton was often left with responsibility for her family and house, although she struggled with the obligations of homemaking. During her mother's illness, Paxton and Wallace created the all-girls Cadiz Club, where they performed plays written and directed by Paxton. Her mother died on May 15, 1903. A month later, Wallace's father died by suicide and Paxton was woken in the night by her own father to comfort her friend.

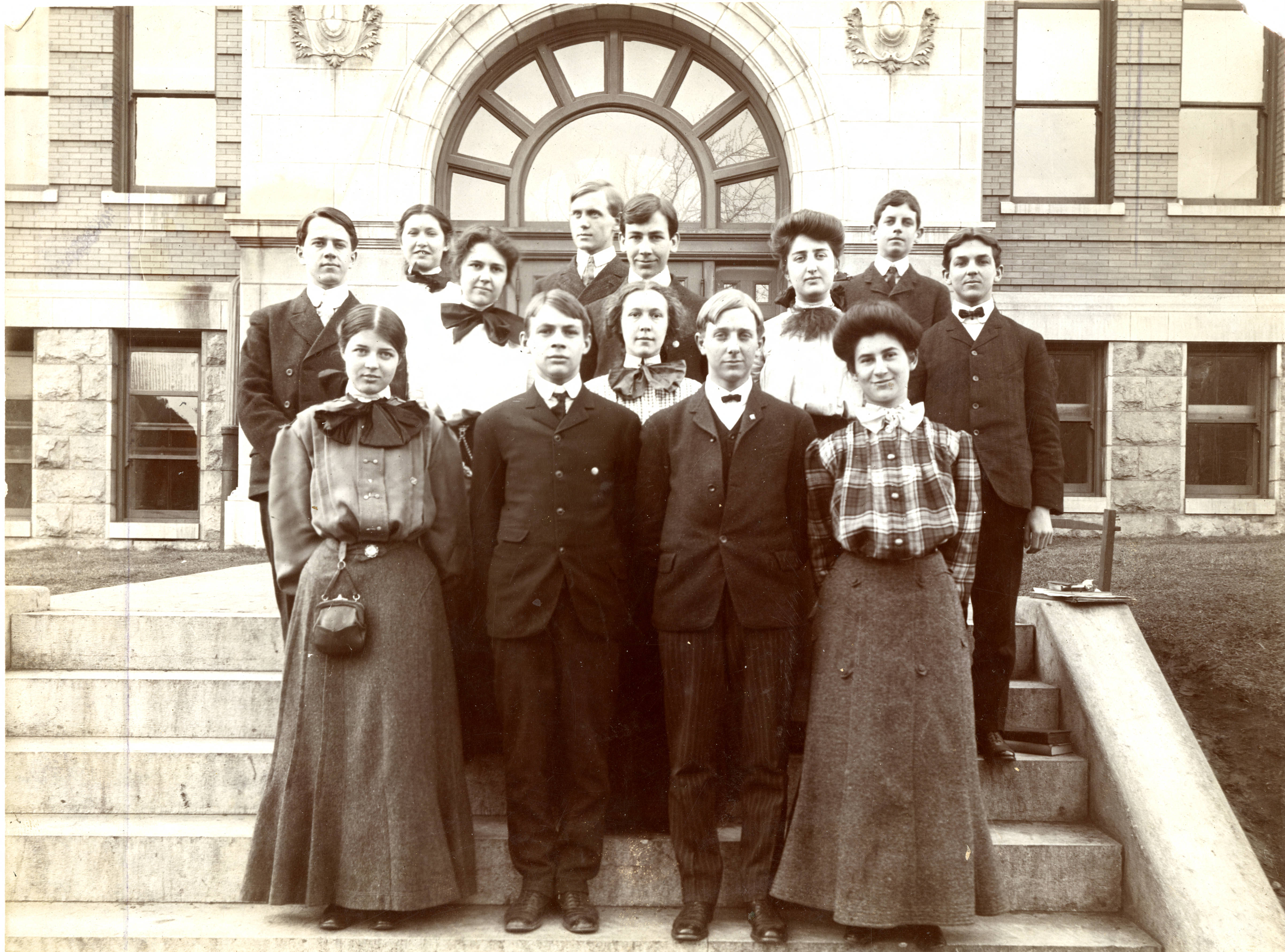
Paxton (bottom left) with the staff of the Nautilus at Manual Training High School in 1903

Paxton grew up in a time when women were increasingly able to receive an education and move into careers traditionally dominated by men, and her family was focused on education. Her maternal grandmother had insisted on sending her daughters to university and as a child, Paxton's father hired the first female stenographer in Independence for his office, a woman named Carey Mae Carroll who later became the first female graduate of the University of Missouri School of Law. Paxton often read with her father and became an avid writer, sending 34 short stories to magazines from 1901 to 1910, although all were rejected. She also wrote poetry, including a 1906 collection titled "A Little Book of Hellish Verse", and wrote in one poem, "The only thing that keeps me from being a maniac is writing and writing and writing".

Paxton's aunt Sally was a teacher at the experimental Manual Training High School in Kansas City, Missouri, where Paxton was a student, although her studies were delayed by two years due to a childhood illness. While in high school, she participated in the theater department, appearing in one play opposite Ted Shawn, and was a humor editor for the school's newspaper. After graduating in 1904, she chose to wait to attend university due to her mother's death and her father's unwillingness to pay. She studied intermittently at Hollins College in Virginia for a year and spent a summer semester as a special student studying criminology at the University of Chicago, although she dropped out when she made up her mind to study journalism as the institution had no journalism program.

=== Missouri School of Journalism ===
In fall 1907, Paxton heard that the journalist Walter Williams had convinced his colleagues at the University of Missouri to establish the Missouri School of Journalism, the first journalism school in the world. She moved to Columbia, Missouri, the following January, although the program would not open until September 14, 1908. Classes were taught in basement of Jesse Hall, and the first cohort consisted of three professors – Williams, Charles Ross, and Silas Bent – and 97 students, including 13 women. (Note: Steve Weinberg lists only 64 students in the freshmen class, with 6 women.) Paxton's father agreed to support her in the pursuit despite her aunts' insisting that women could not be reporters, but she insisted on going as "[her] family were pioneers" and she "knew [she] had to behave with a certain amount of dignity because nobody would follow [her] if [she] didn't".

Only weeks into the academic year, the University of Missouri Journalism Students' Association was founded and Paxton was elected as the first vice president. Paxton was also involved with the program's newspaper, the Columbia Missourian, and was instrumental in challenging the policy of the university yearbook, the Savitar, which prohibited women from joining. She was informed that as the men smoked at meetings, women could not attend. In response, Paxton organized the women on campus to vote a certain way in the student elections, backing candidates who would agree to change the yearbook's policy. When the rule was relaxed, she was offered a position on the staff but turned it down in favor of another woman.

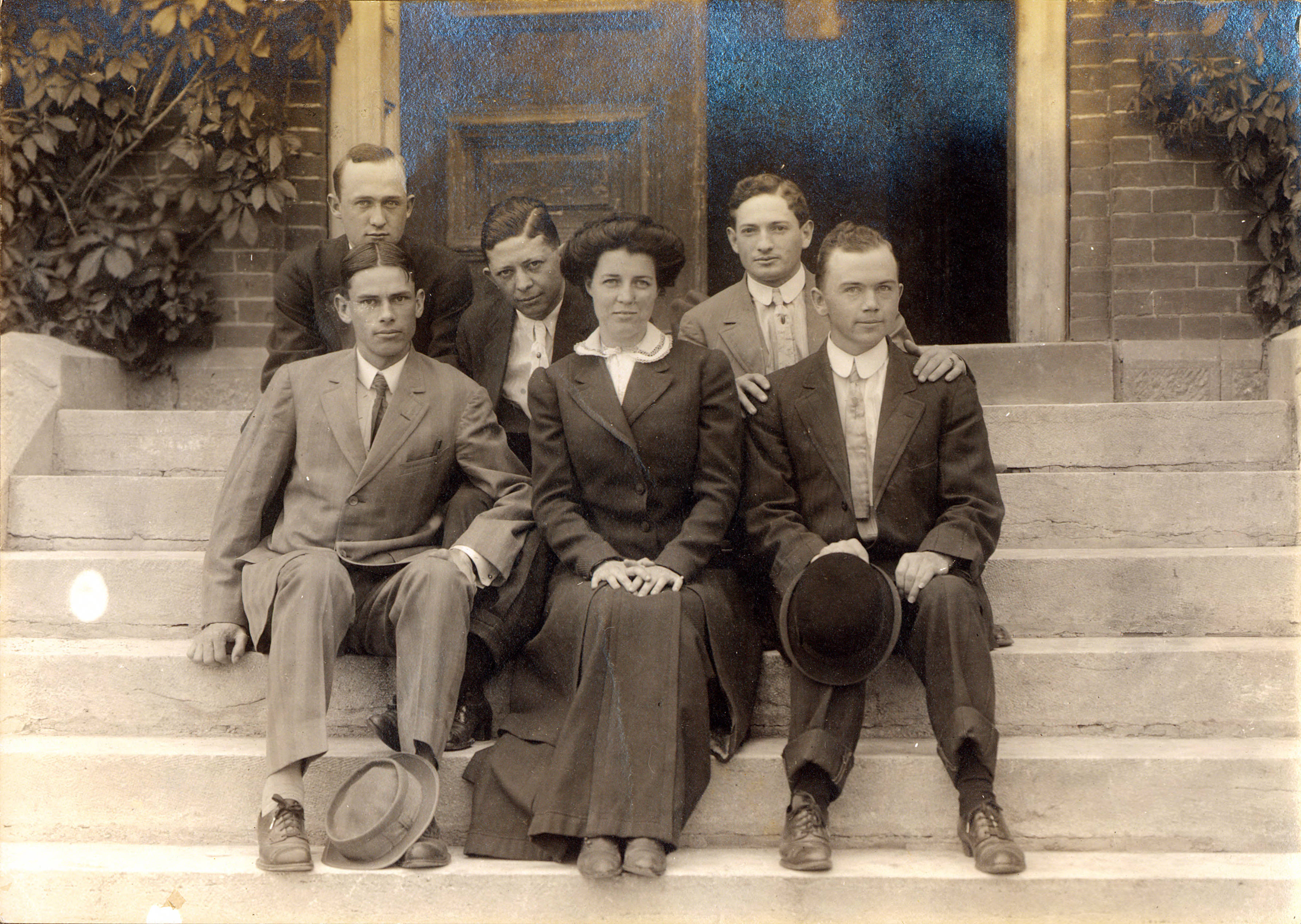
Paxton with the Missouri School of Journalism's 1910 graduating class

Paxton began dating Ross in spring 1909. They knew each other from their hometown and had gone on a date the year prior, beginning a correspondence that would produce 400 letters in two years. As a student, she was living at the Kappa Kappa Gamma sorority house, which caused Ross embarrassment due to his status as her professor. Her father had bought her a second-hand Remington typewriter when she was twelve, which made her the only person on campus to own a typewriter, and her room in the house was nicknamed "Hell" for the mess and the sound of the typewriter. Paxton was similarly conscious of her relationship with Ross and avoided working on the Missourian as Ross taught the course. The couple made plans that summer to eventually marry. (Note: Margaret Truman indicates in her book that Paxton had fallen in love with Ross in the summer of 1907 and her early move to Columbia was influenced by her feelings.)

As a member of the journalism school's first cohort, Paxton was given unusual assignments, including being asked by Bent to conduct an interview with the mascot of a rival college, which turned out to be a live bear cub. She later criticized the program's instruction, as she said none of her professors had taught her how to copyedit. Just before graduation, Paxton learned that she was short of credit hours and spoke to Williams, who agreed to give her credit for her extracurricular submissions to publications as he wanted a woman in the first graduating class. He asked her to choose the color of the graduation tassel. She chose red, which has been maintained throughout the program’s history. In 1910, Paxton became the program's first female graduate, one of six students graduating with a bachelor's of journalism. Following her graduation, Williams often introduced her as "the first woman in all the world to hold a degree in journalism".

== Career ==
=== Kansas City Post ===
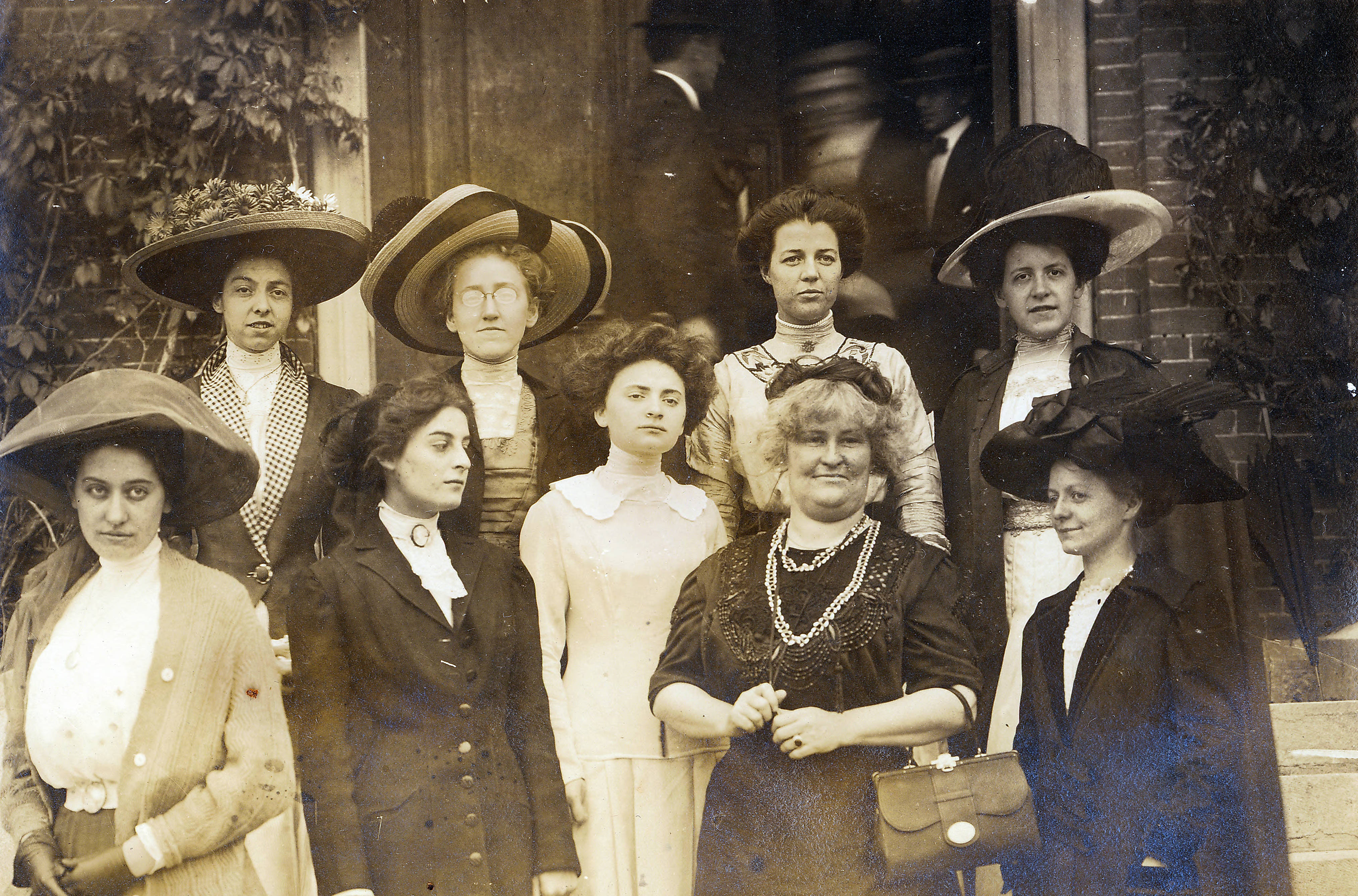
Paxton (second from the right, back row) with Winifred Bonfils at the university's 1910 journalism week

Paxton met Winifred Bonfils, wife of the manager of the Kansas City Post, during the college's 1910 Editor's Week and was offered a job. The Kansas City Star refused to take a female reporter so Paxton accepted the position, although she described it as "the yellowest newspaper in the country, next to the Hearst publications." A week after her graduation, she began working for the Post as a reporter for $8 a week. The job made her one of the first female journalists in Kansas City and she later said that her male colleagues would walk past to stare at her in the office. Her editor, A. B. McDonald, was not happy about her hiring, both because she was a woman and because she was a journalism school graduate.

As a special reporter for the paper, Paxton covered a variety of topics, including the usual "sob sister" coverage of divorces and custody fights, society stories, news from the local schools, and women's features. For the latter category, she interviewed and wrote about suffragists and women, including Emma Goldman, Laura Gregg Cannon, and Sylvia Pankhurst, and reported on a local women's prison and a project to construct a hotel for homeless girls. In one story, she reported on her experiences in the city's red-light district. Between 1910 and 1911, she investigated the State Training School for Girls in Chillicothe as the superintendent was alleged to be training the girls to be prostitutes. The story consistently made front page news for the paper and as a result of her investigation, the school undertook an internal reorganization to improve the conditions.

Paxton's choice to work for the paper caused tension in her relationship with Ross, as he disapproved of her job and the stories she covered. In one instance, she was asked to report on a demonstration by US Army Officers of a "man-carrying kite" at Fort Leavenworth in Kansas. She asked her editor if she could fly in the kite and, when he refused, received permission from the managing editor Charles A. Bonfils. She went up on the kite and a photo was published on the front page of the Post. The following day, her father and brothers were disappointed and Ross was uncomfortable, believing that she had disgraced her family. Fifteen months into her assignment with the paper, she suffered from a bout of appendicitis. This illness brought Paxton and Ross brought the couple closer together when she left her job, but when he told his mother of the planned wedding, she was strongly opposed due to Paxton's career. The couple broke up and Paxton began two years of extreme distress. Around the same time, Paxton's father remarried and she began to lose weight, causing her family to worry that she had developed tuberculosis. Ross married Florence Griffin in 1913, although Paxton and Ross remained close throughout their lives, meeting infrequently but carrying on a regular correspondence. Paxton's father convinced her to stay with cousins at a plantation near Greenville, Mississippi, where she remained for two years.

=== Graduate studies ===
Paxton then taught at an orphanage in Missouri for a year. While back in Columbia, Williams encouraged her to specialize in her career by studying home economics journalism. She enrolled in a course at the University of Chicago but failed to graduate, having one semester of coursework left, and moved to Alabama and Virginia to work with 4-H clubs for three and a half years. She worked for the Department of Agriculture as a home demonstration agent, headquartered in Roanoke, Virginia. Travelling frequently, she trained rural homemakers on efficient ways to run their homes and farms, and worked alongside her younger sister, Elizabeth, until she got married. While working Virginia, Paxton met Edmund Burke Keeley, a farm manager, who was the first man in Halifax County, Virginia, to volunteer for military service although he was rejected due to his hearing.

=== Marriage and World War I ===
Upon the United States entering World War I, Paxton decided to get involved. In 1917, she wrote to Wallace to advise that she had been accepted by the YMCA to work overseas in the canteens. At the time, she was engaged to Keeley, although letters to her friend indicate that she was torn between two men. Paxton was sent to France, where she worked for a year and a half, keeping a diary the whole time. She was traveling with the Pollard Unit, organized by the Virginia governor John Garland Pollard, when the Armistice was announced. Arriving in Paris, Paxton and a fellow canteen worker Anna Blanton were assigned to Langres, and later Prauthoy, with the 601st Engineers until they returned home, when the women joined the 36th Division. They were greeted by General John J. Pershing and Paxton later traveled to watch President Woodrow Wilson speak when he visited Humes.

While overseas, Paxton observed that the soldiers spoke in slang terms, which she reported in an article published in the journal American Speech in 1930 titled "A.E.F. English". The article provides a list of words, including terms such as "shavetail" and "bunk fatigue", and represents the first list of World War I slang compiled by a woman. Many of the terms that she defined were later included in Howard N. Rose's Thesaurus of Slang and Maurice Harley Weseen's Dictionary of American Slang, both published in 1934.

Due to the war, Paxton missed Wallace's wedding to Harry Truman on June 9, 1919, but arrived back in the United States shortly thereafter in July 1919. She married Keeley in New York City at the Little Church Around the Corner. The couple moved back to Virginia, where Keeley was manager of Curles Neck Farm, and Paxton gave birth to their son, John Gallatin Paxton Keeley, on October 18, 1921. Two years later, Wallace gave birth to her daughter Margaret Truman, and Paxton was named one of her godmothers. Around the same time, Paxton's husband fell ill with kidney disease and was transferred to the Battle Creek Sanitarium in Michigan. She had planned to take up employment with a railroad magazine but her brother advised her to return to Missouri and she worked briefly in Holt County as a home extension agent before working as a reporter for the Atchison County Mail, beginning in March 1926. She was a feature writer and head of public relations for the paper. Meanwhile, her husband's disease had spread to his mind and he was transferred to a state mental hospital in Virginia, where he died in 1926. Paxton returned to her family in Independence in 1927 with pneumonia and when she recovered, she was encouraged by her family and friends to leave the newspaper for her health.

=== Christian College ===
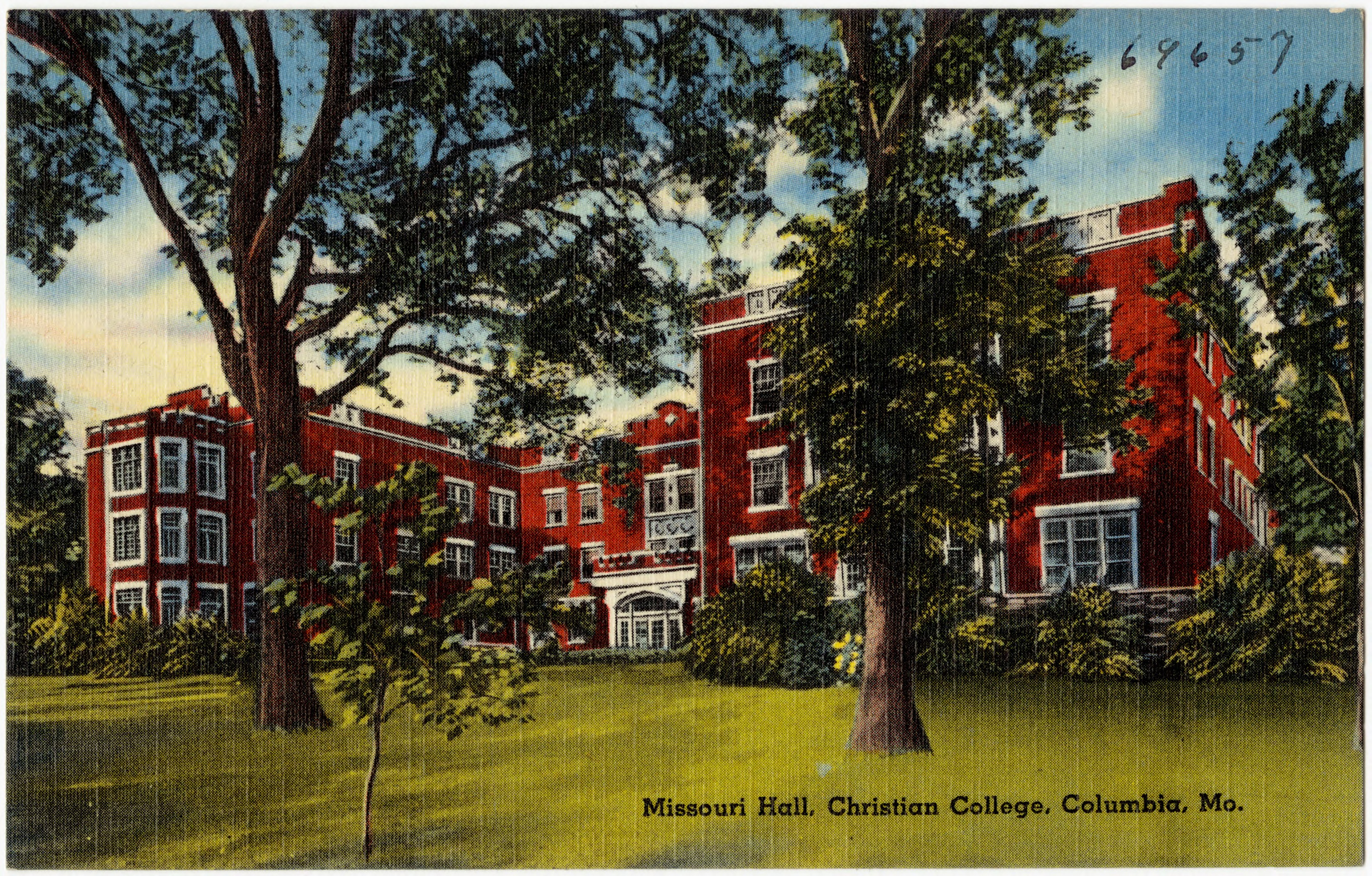
Christian College during the 1930s

Paxton took her father's advice and decided to become a teacher. She studied at the University of Missouri for her master's degree in journalism. While studying, she lived with her son at the Theta Phi Alpha house, where she was a chaperone for the sorority girls. Her master's thesis was titled "The Appeal of the Women's Page", based on a survey she sent to roughly 500 rural and urban women in Missouri to determine what women wanted to read in the newspaper. The thesis was approved on July 2, 1928. She joined Christian College (now Columbia College), a women's liberal arts college, the following year as a journalism instructor. She instructed her students to refer to her as Mary Pax and was known on campus and around town for her short haircut and for regularly riding her bicycle. While there, she taught creative writing and founded the student newspaper, The Microphone. The publication, under her supervision, was awarded many prizes in publication competitions for state junior colleges. She wrote an anonymous article about low salaries for teachers, which was published by the Ladies' Home Journal, and was briefly the managing editor for the Missouri Federation of Women's Clubs publication, The Missouri Clubwoman, during the 1930s.

In 1928, Paxton published a children's book with Bobbs-Merrill, River Gold. The story followed three young boys – modeled after her son and two of her nephews, Edward Clardy Paxton and John Gallatin Paxton – who found buried treasure along a riverbank in Missouri. The book received generally positive reviews. She also wrote several plays, some of which were performed locally. The Kettle Singing won the University of Missouri's annual contest and was sold to the Walter H. Baker Company in 1929. It was also broadcast by the Kansas City-based radio station KMBC in February 1929. She wrote Vinnie Ream, about the sculptor and Christian College alumni Vinnie Ream, with Henry L. Mueller. The River Rat won the St. Louis Art League's contest in 1931. The following year, Wind in the Stars was performed locally, based on the story of Theodosia Burr. She published Christian College Prize Plays in 1934, an edited collection of her students' plays.

Paxton and Wallace continued to write each other frequent letters, although Paxton made a point of avoiding Washington, D.C. so Wallace would not feel she was looking for favors. Wallace and Truman were frustrated that the press often portrayed them as "rubes", including a story by a reporter for The Kansas City Star, Duke Shoop, about their experience at a party thrown by D.C. socialite Evalyn Walsh McLean. In response, Paxton wrote a letter to Wallace in February 1945, advising that Truman – by then vice-president of the United States – would benefit from appointing a press secretary. Ross was ultimately given the post, after Truman was elevated to the presidency.

== Later life ==
Paxton retired from teaching in June 1952, although she continued to write a gardening column for The Kansas City Star and to edit the Missouri Alumnus. She edited The Boone County Cookbook and wrote articles for Woman's Day, The Ladies' Home Journal, and Writer's Monthly. She was also an amateur genealogist and photographer, showing off her photographs and paintings locally in 1965, and created a series of dolls for historical women in the state which were showcased at the 1939 World's Fair. She painted a historical mural for Calvary Episcopal Church in Columbia, which Wallace described as "the most interesting thing you have ever done". Paxton was in regular correspondence with several well-known Missourians, including the Trumans, the poet Orrick Glenday Johns, the author Homer Croy, the poet Thomas McAfee, and the writer Rose Wilder Lane. Paxton helped found the Columbia Art League in 1959 and joined Kappa Kappa Gamma, Theta Sigma Phi, and Kappa Tau Alpha.

Paxton privately published a memoir about her parents, titled Mary Gentry and John Gallatin Paxton, a memoir, which was part of a longer memoir, Back in Independence. She also partnered with the Boone County Historical Society to conduct oral histories about the area and worked on a book titled Boone County Tales. Her only son died on November 5, 1971, from the same kidney disorder that had killed his father. The following year, Paxton traveled from Columbia to visit Wallace while Truman was dying in the hospital. In 1977, she moved to the Lenoir Convalescent Center in Columbia, where she published poetry in the center's anthology. Prior to Wallace's death in 1981, Paxton wrote in her final letter to her lifelong friend, "No one could take your place in my life".

== Death and legacy ==
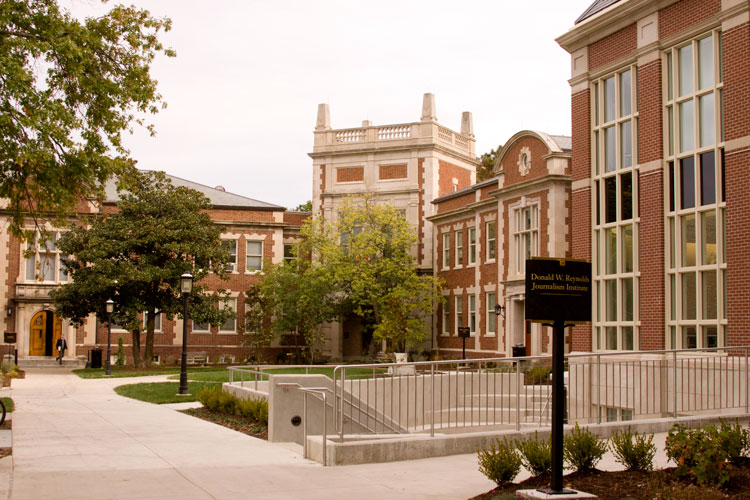
Campus of the Missouri School of Journalism in 2008

Paxton died on December 6, 1986, at the Lenoir Convalescent Center at the age of 100. She received the Alumni Citation Award from the Missouri School of Journalism and her graduation portrait has hung in the university's graduate studies center in Walter Williams Hall since 1974. The seminar suite in the graduate studies center was renamed to honor Paxton when she turned 100. While at Christian College, Paxton acquired the original copy desk from the Missouri School of Journalism and a plaque was added to the desk to honor her in May 1966. In fall 2002, Mary Paxton Keeley Elementary School of the Columbia Public School system was named in her honor. She was featured in a sculpture titled "Keys to the City" outside the Columbia City Hall in 2010.

Paxton was described as "The First Lady of Missouri Journalism". Following her death, her book Back in Independence was published, at her request. Her papers are held by the State Historical Society of Missouri and the National Women and Media Collection at the University of Missouri. The Harry S. Truman Presidential Library has her correspondence with Ross and an oral history with Paxton that was conducted by James R. Fuchs.

== Works ==
- River Gold (1928)
- Mary Gentry and John Gallatin Paxton, a memoir (1967)
- Christian College Prize Plays Volume I (1934)
- Back in Independence (1992)
