= Clifton Daniel =

American newspaperman (1912–2000)

- Born: Elbert Clifton Daniel Jr. September 19, 1912; Zebulon, North Carolina, U.S.
- Died: February 21, 2000 (aged 87); New York City, U.S.
- Occupation: Newspaperman
- Spouse: Margaret Truman (m. 1956)
- Children: 4, including Clifton Truman Daniel
- Relatives: Harry S. Truman (father-in-law); Bess Truman (mother-in-law)

Elbert Clifton Daniel Jr. (September 19, 1912 – February 21, 2000) was an American newspaperman who was the managing editor of The New York Times from 1964 to 1969. Before assuming the top editorial job at the paper, he served as the paper's London and Moscow bureau chief.

Daniel was married to former United States President Harry S. Truman's daughter, Margaret on April 21, 1956, at Trinity Episcopal Church in Independence, Missouri. The couple resided in Washington, D.C., and New York City.

== Biography ==
Daniel was born to Elbert Clifton Daniel, the mayor and druggist of Zebulon, North Carolina, and Elvah T. Jones Daniel in 1912. Having heart disease, Clifton Daniel suffered a stroke and succumbed on February 21, 2000, at his Park Avenue apartment in Manhattan, aged 87.

He and his wife Margaret, who died in January 2008, had four sons. His 41-year-old son William Wallace Daniel followed his father in death a little over six months later on September 4, 2000, after being hit by a taxicab in Manhattan.

Daniel appeared as a contestant on the July 15, 1956, episode of What's My Line?, and as a guest panelist on the June 16, 1957, episode.
