= Greta Kempton =

Austrian-American painter

- Kempton with her portrait of President Harry Truman
- Born: Martha Greta Kempton; March 22, 1901; Vienna, Austria-Hungary
- Died: December 9, 1991 (aged 90); New York City, New York
- Resting place: Church of the Transfiguration, New York City
- Education: Academy of Fine Arts Vienna
- Known for: Painting
- Spouse: Ambrose M. McNamara

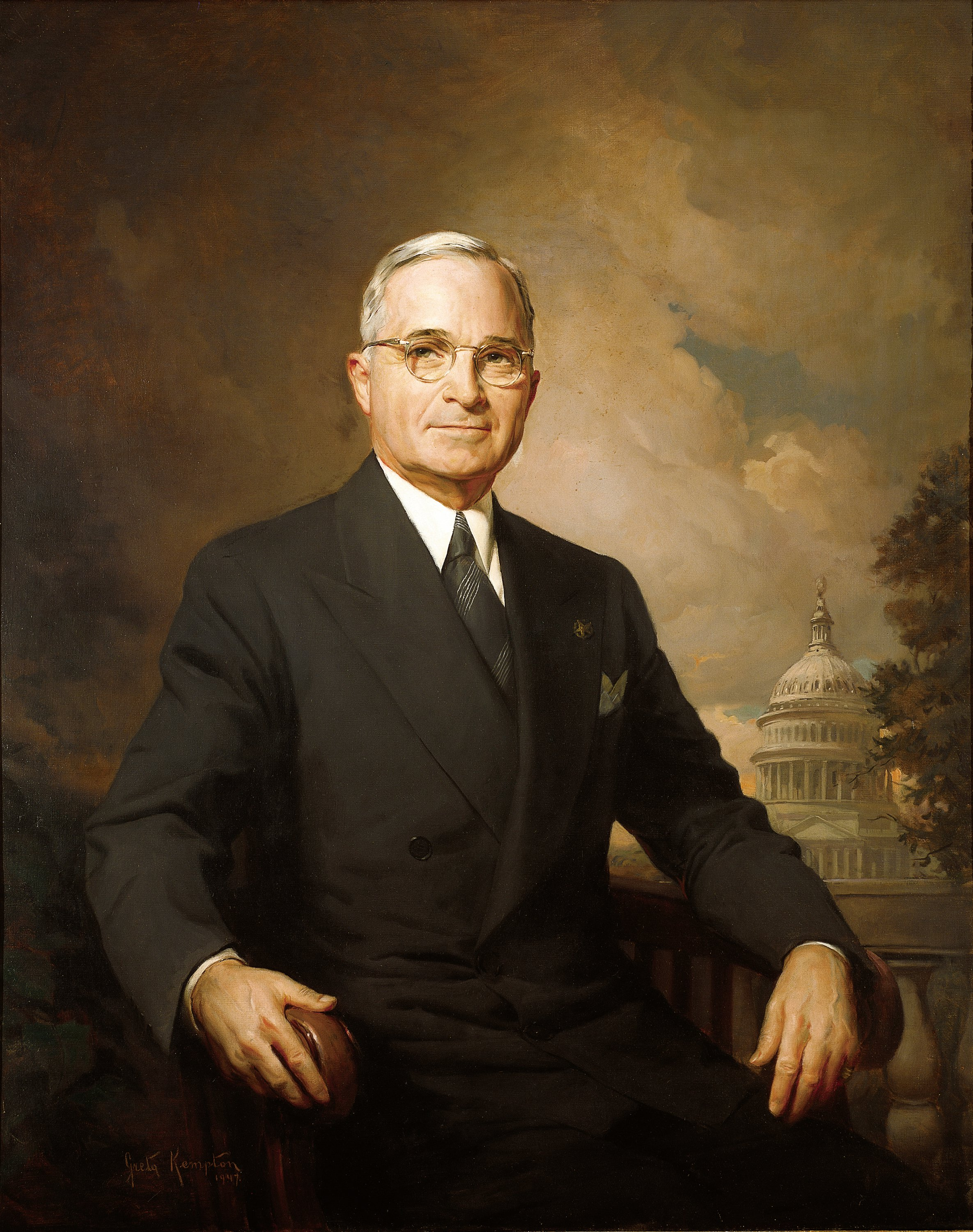
Presidential portrait of Truman, painted by Greta Kempton.

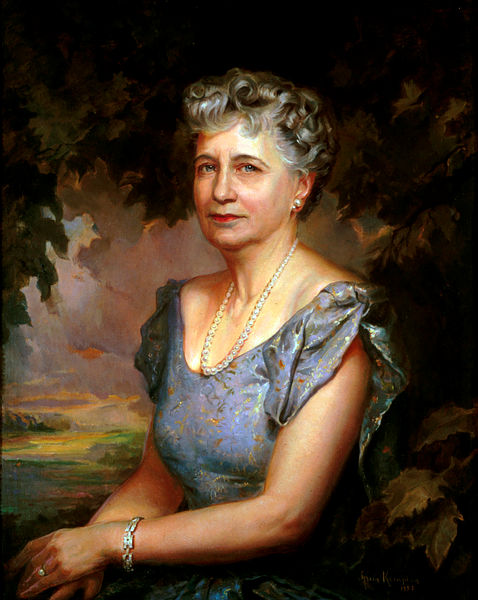
White House portrait of Bess Truman, painted by Greta Kempton.

Martha Greta Kempton (March 22, 1901 – December 9, 1991) was an Austrian-American painter who was the White House artist during the Truman administration.

== Biography ==
Kempton was born in Vienna and came to the United States in the 1920s. She studied at the Vienna Academy of Fine Arts before emigrating to the United States and in the 1930s was a student at the National Academy of Design and Art Students League, both in New York City.

By the 1930s Kempton was living in California and a well-established portrait painter. Her style was reminiscent of Rembrandt, Rubens, and other European masters. By the 1940s, she had compiled a list of subjects, including Dagmar Nordstrom, one of the Nordstrom Sisters, the families of some Hollywood residents of New Orleans, where she lived with her then-husband, the businessman Ambrose M. McNamara. Kempton became well known in Washington following the unveiling in 1947 of her portrait of Drucie Snyder, the daughter of Treasury Secretary John W. Snyder. Through Snyder, Kempton gained introductions to other high officials of the Truman administration. Later in 1947, she painted a portrait of Bess Truman, and that same year was commissioned to paint a portrait of the President himself - the first of five Kempton paintings for which Mr. Truman posed. The 1947 painting became the official White House portrait of President Truman.

She remained active as a painter well into her eighties and restored many paintings at Church of the Transfiguration, "The Little Church Around the Corner" in New York City. Her works are in the collections of the White House, the U.S. Department of the Treasury, the U.S. Supreme Court, the Harry S. Truman Library, the Franklin D. Roosevelt Library, the National Portrait Gallery, and a number of museums. Her papers, which include a number of portraits, now form a collection at the Harry S. Truman Library in Independence, Missouri.

She died in New York City from heart failure in December 1991, and her ashes were placed in the columbarium in the Church of the Transfiguration, Manhattan.
