= Jane Hadley Barkley =

Second Lady of the United States from 1949 to 1953

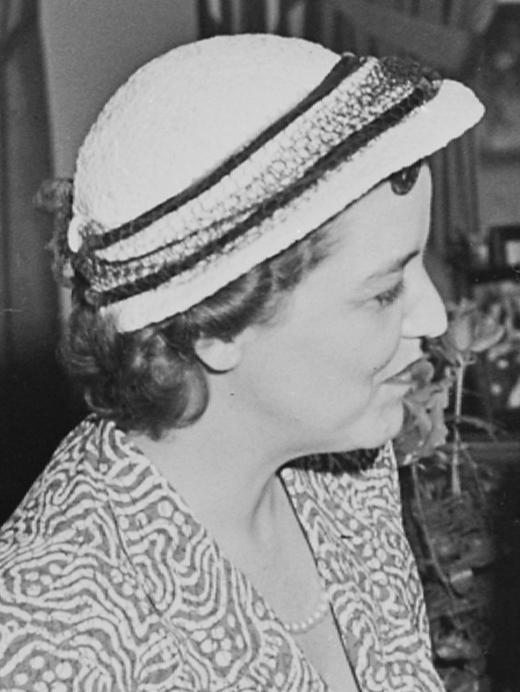
- Barkley in 1950

Second Lady of the United States
- In role November 18, 1949 – January 20, 1953
- Vice President: Alben W. Barkley
- Preceded by: Bess Truman
- Succeeded by: Pat Nixon

Personal details
- Born: Elizabeth Jane Rucker; September 23, 1911 Keytesville, Missouri, U.S.
- Died: September 6, 1964 (aged 52) Washington, D.C., U.S.
- Resting place: Valhalla Cemetery, St. Louis County, Missouri
- Party: Democratic
- Other political affiliations: Republican (formerly)
- Spouses: Carleton Hadley (m. 1931; died 1944) Alben Barkley (m. 1949; died 1956)
- Children: 2 (with Hadley)

Elizabeth Jane Barkley (née Rucker, formerly Hadley; September 23, 1911 – September 6, 1964), also commonly known as Jane Hadley Barkley, was the second lady of the United States from 1949 to 1953, as the wife of Vice President Alben W. Barkley.

== Early life ==
She was born in Keytesville, Missouri; her father was a lawyer and her mother a pianist who had studied in Europe. She married her first husband, Carleton Hadley, a lawyer, in 1931. Hadley, whom she met at Washington University in St. Louis, became a prominent railroad attorney. They had two daughters before his death in 1945 at 42.

Carleton Sturtevant Hadley (Dec. 23, 1902 in Lowell, Massachusetts – Feb. 16, 1945 St. Louis, Missouri) came from the prominent Massachusetts Hadley family. He earned a B.A. (1923), LL.M. (1927), and M.A. (1929) from Washington University. He married Rucker in 1931, and had two children. He was a revered attorney nationally and a prominent member of the St. Louis Republican Party, and died from a heart attack aged 42 in St. Louis on February 16, 1945.

== Marriage to Alben Barkley ==
She married Vice President Alben Barkley, a widower, on November 18, 1949. She was his second wife, and he was her second husband. At the time of marriage Barkley was 33 years her senior. He was 71 years old and she was 38. Barkley's first wife, Dorothy, had died in 1947. Until her courtship with Barkley, Jane Rucker Hadley had been a devoted Republican. In 1940, Mrs. Hadley was working in the St. Louis office of GOP presidential nominee Wendell Willkie. When her milkman expressed fondness for President Franklin D. Roosevelt, she left a note saying, "No Willkie, no milkie".

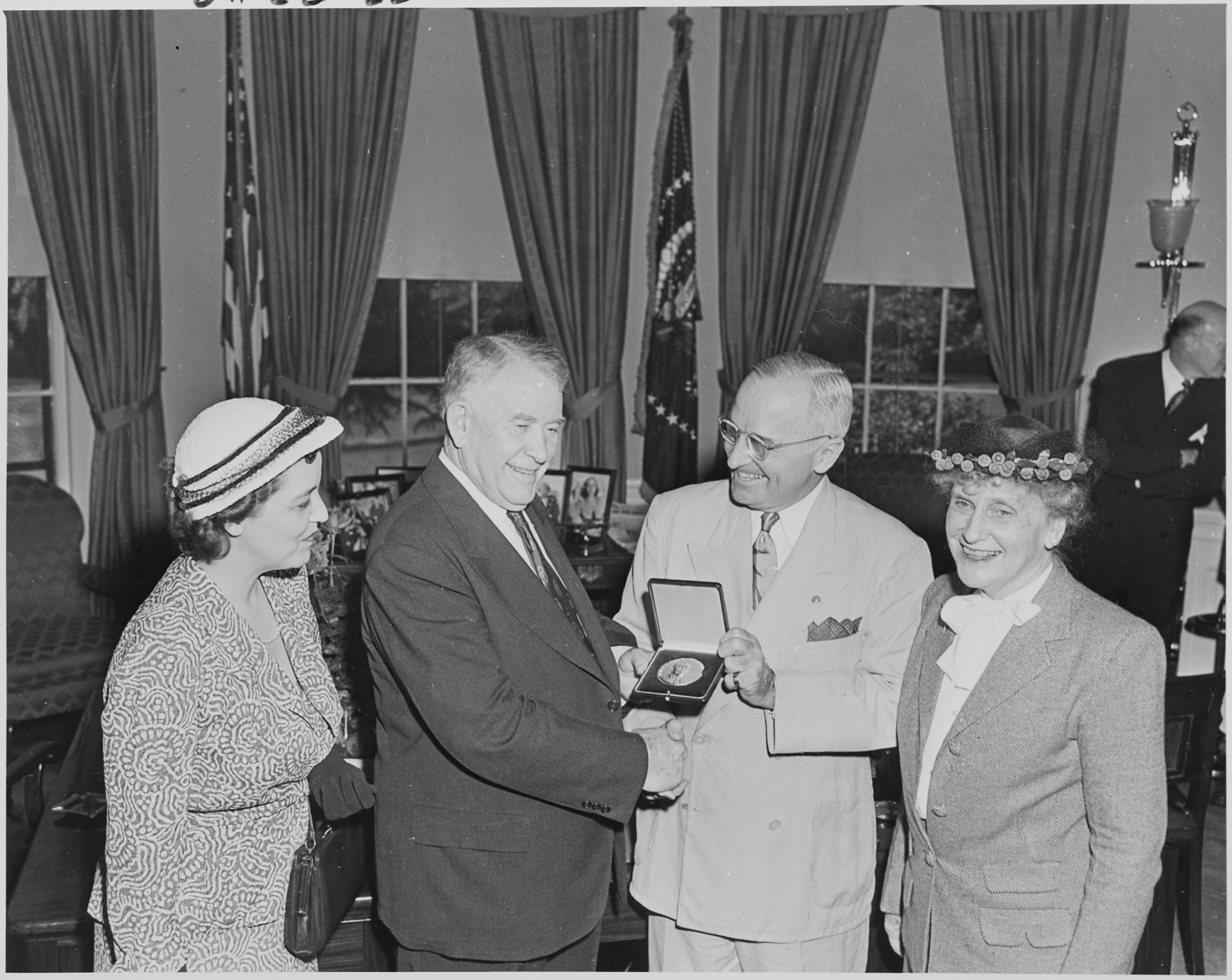
Jane Barkley (far left), next to Alben Barkley

After meeting the young widow in May 1949 at a party in Washington, the Vice President courted her ardently. He was not deterred by her politics or a long-distance relationship. The Vice President began making regular commercial airline stops in St. Louis. Their courtship captured national attention. She resided in a seven-room apartment in St. Louis's prestigious Central West End neighborhood, near both Washington University and the renowned Forest Park. On October 30, 1949, they announced their engagement.

They married at St. John's Methodist Church in St. Louis on November 18. The ceremony was attended by 33 family members and one vice presidential aide, along with about 60 reporters. Outside, an estimated 5,000 people cheered the couple as they departed in a black convertible the groom gave as a wedding gift. When asked about his wife's politics, the vice president said, "She got swept off her feet by Willkie, but now she's back in the fold."

Her husband's term as vice president ended Jan. 20, 1953. He sought the Democratic presidential nomination at the party convention in 1952 but withdrew when labor leaders on whom he had counted declined to support him. He defeated Republican John Sherman Cooper for another term in the U.S. Senate in 1954, serving until his death on March 30, 1956.

== Death ==
After Barkley's death, Jane Barkley accepted a position as a secretary at George Washington University in Washington, D.C. Mrs. Barkley published a memoir in 1958 with New York's Vanguard Press, entitled I Married the Veep. She died on September 6, 1964, from a heart attack at the age of 52, and was still employed at George Washington University.

Barkley was buried at Valhalla Cemetery in Bel-Nor, Missouri.

Honorary titles
Vacant Title last held by Bess Truman	Second Lady of the United States; 1949–1953	Succeeded by Pat Nixon
