= Margaret Truman =

American soprano, writer and daughter of President Harry S. Truman (1924–2008)

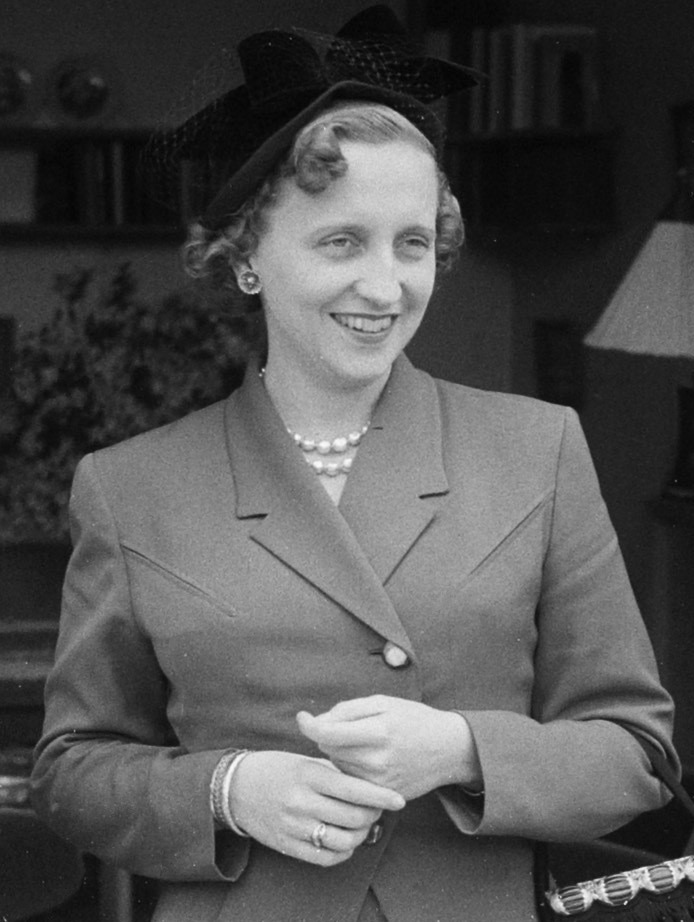
- Truman in 1951
- Born: Mary Margaret Truman; February 17, 1924; Independence, Missouri, U.S.
- Died: January 29, 2008 (aged 83); Chicago, Illinois, U.S.
- Burial place: Harry S. Truman Presidential Library and Museum, Independence, Missouri, U.S.
- Education: George Washington University (BA)
- Occupations: Singer, writer, historian
- Spouse: Clifton Daniel (m. 1956; died 2000)
- Children: 4, including Clifton Truman Daniel
- Parents: Harry S. Truman; Bess Wallace
- Writing career
- Years active: 1947–2008
- Genres: Mystery fiction, biography, autobiography

Mary Margaret Truman Daniel (February 17, 1924 – January 29, 2008) was an American classical soprano, actress, journalist, radio and television personality, writer, and New York socialite. She was the only child of President Harry S. Truman and First Lady Bess Truman. While her father was president during the years 1945 to 1953, Margaret regularly accompanied him on campaign trips, such as the 1948 countrywide whistle-stop campaign lasting several weeks. She also appeared at important White House and political events during those years and was a favorite with the media.

After graduating from George Washington University in 1946, Truman embarked on a career as a coloratura soprano, beginning with a concert appearance with the Detroit Symphony Orchestra in 1947. She appeared in the US in concerts with orchestras and in recitals through 1956. She made recordings for RCA Victor and made television appearances on programs such as What's My Line? and The Bell Telephone Hour.

In 1957, one year after her marriage, Truman abandoned her singing career to pursue a career as a journalist and radio personality when she became the cohost of the program Weekday with Mike Wallace. She also wrote articles as an independent journalist for a variety of publications in the 1960s and 1970s. Truman later became the successful author of a series of murder mysteries as well as a number of works on first ladies and their families, including well-received biographies of her father.

Truman was married to journalist Clifton Daniel, managing editor of The New York Times. The couple had four sons and lived in a Park Avenue apartment.

== Early life ==
Mary Margaret Truman was born at 219 North Delaware Street in Independence, Missouri, on February 17, 1924 and was named for her aunt Mary Jane Truman and maternal grandmother Margaret Gates Wallace, but she was called Margaret from early childhood. She took voice and piano lessons as a child (at the encouragement of her father, who famously played piano) and attended public school in Independence until her father's 1934 election to the United States Senate, after which her education was split between public schools in Independence and Gunston Hall School, a private school for girls in Washington, D.C.

In 1942, Truman matriculated at George Washington University, where she was a member of Pi Beta Phi, and earned a Bachelor of Arts degree in history and international relations in 1946. In June 1944, she christened the battleship USS Missouri at Brooklyn Navy Yard, and spoke again in 1986 at the ship's recommissioning. She studied singing with Estelle Liebling, the voice teacher of Beverly Sills, in New York City.

On April 12, 1945, President Franklin D. Roosevelt died and his vice president Harry Truman assumed the presidency when Margaret was 21.

== Career ==
=== Singing ===
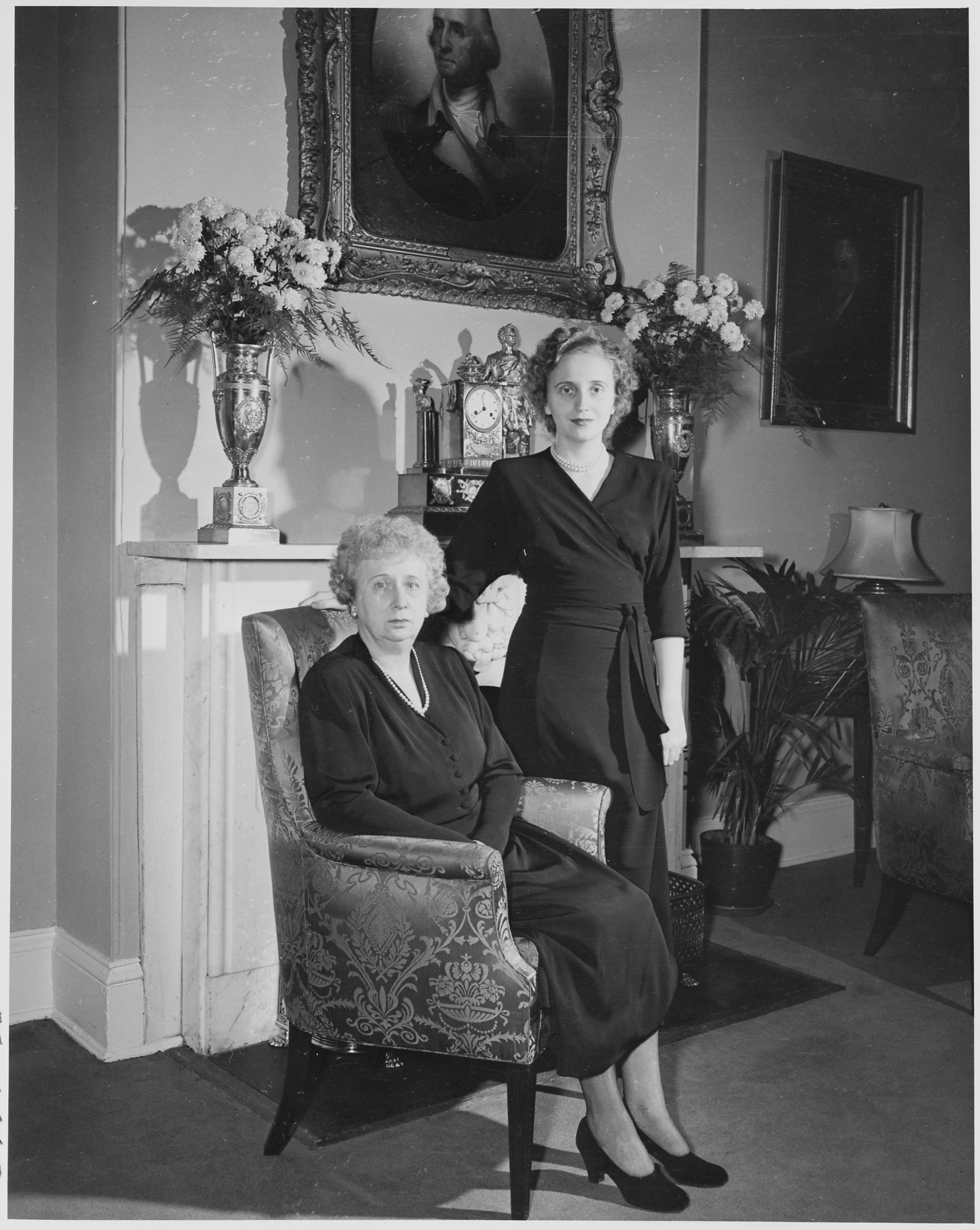
Truman with her mother in Washington, D.C. in 1948

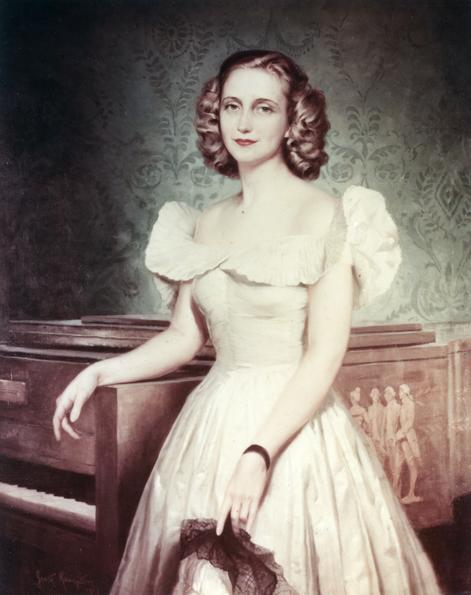
Truman portrait by Greta Kempton, c. 1947

When Truman was 16 years old, she began taking voice lessons in Independence from Mrs. Thomas J. Strickler, a family friend. After classical vocal training, Truman's singing career began with a debut radio recital in March 1947, followed shortly thereafter with her professional concert debut with the Detroit Symphony Orchestra. She sang professionally for the next decade, appearing with major American orchestras and embarking on several national concert tours. In 1950 she began studying singing with Sidney Dietch.

Some of her credits include concert appearances with the Los Angeles Philharmonic at the Hollywood Bowl, the National Symphony Orchestra, the NBC Symphony Orchestra, the Pittsburgh Symphony, the Philadelphia Orchestra, and the Saint Louis Symphony. While she never performed in staged operas, she did perform opera arias in concert. Her performances were mainly of both sacred and secular art songs, Lieder, and works from the concert soprano repertoire. In 1951 and 1952, RCA Victor issued two albums by Truman, one of classical selections, the other of American art songs. She also made recordings of German Lieder for NBC. A 1951 Time Magazine cover featured Truman with a single musical note floating by her head. She performed on stage, radio, and television through 1956.

At the beginning of her career, critical reviews of Truman's singing were positive, polite or diplomatic in tone, with some later reviewers speculating that negative opinions were withheld from deference to her father as a current president. This practice was broken in 1950 when Washington Post music critic Paul Hume wrote that Truman was "extremely attractive on the stage... [but] cannot sing very well. She is flat a good deal of the time. And still cannot sing with anything approaching professional finish." The review angered President Truman (who was dealing that same day with the sudden death of his childhood friend and White House press secretary Charlie Ross), who wrote to Hume, "Some day I hope to meet you. When that happens you'll need a new nose, a lot of beefsteak for black eyes, and perhaps a supporter below!" Hume wanted to publish the letter, but Washington Post publisher Philip Graham vetoed the idea. However, Hume showed the letter to a number of his colleagues, including Milton Berliner, music critic of the rival Washington Times Herald, which published a story. The Washington Post was then forced to acknowledge the letter, which drew international headlines, becoming a minor scandal for the Truman administration. Subsequent reviewers felt freer to be honest in their reviews of her performances, with mixed criticism for her singing thereafter.

=== Acting, radio, and journalism ===
Truman's professional acting debut occurred on April 26, 1951 when she costarred with James Stewart in the "Jackpot" episode of Screen Directors Playhouse on NBC radio. On March 17, 1952, Truman was a guest soloist on The Railroad Hour in a presentation of the operetta Sari.

Truman also performed on the NBC Radio program The Big Show where she met writer Goodman Ace, who offered her advice and pointers. Ace became a lifelong friend, advising Truman even after The Big Show. Truman became part of the team of NBC Radio's Weekday show that premiered in 1955, shortly after its Monitor program made its debut. Paired with Mike Wallace, she presented news and interviews aimed at a female listening audience.

She appeared several times as a panelist (and twice as a mystery guest) on the game show What's My Line? and guest-starred multiple times on NBC's The Martha Raye Show.

In 1957, Truman sang and played piano on The Gisele MacKenzie Show.

=== Writing ===
Truman's full-length biography of her father, published shortly before his 1972 death, was critically acclaimed. She also wrote a personal biography of her mother and histories of the White House and its inhabitants (including first ladies and pets). Truman published regularly into her eighties.

==== Novels ====
From 1980 to 2011, 25 books in the Capital Crimes series of murder mysteries, most set in and around Washington, D.C., were published under Margaret Truman's name.

Professional ghostwriter Donald Bain (1935–2017) acknowledged in the March 14, 2014, issue of Publishers Weekly that he had written "27 novels in the Margaret Truman Capital Crimes series (mostly bylined by Truman, my close collaborator – my name is on only the most recent entries, released after her death)."

In 2000, another ghostwriter, William Harrington, had claimed in a self-written obituary before his apparent suicide that Margaret Truman and others were his clients.

=== Institutions ===
She served on the board of directors for the Harry S. Truman Presidential Library and Museum and the Board of Governors of the Roosevelt Institute, and served as a Trustee for her alma mater.

== Personal life ==
On April 21, 1956, Truman married Clifton Daniel, a reporter for The New York Times and later its managing editor, at Trinity Episcopal Church in Independence; he died in 2000. They had four sons:

- Clifton Truman Daniel (born June 5, 1957), Director of Public Relations for Harry S Truman College.
- William Wallace Daniel (May 19, 1960 – September 4, 2000), a psychiatric social worker and researcher at Columbia University. He died after being struck by a taxicab in New York City.
- Harrison Gates Daniel (born 1963)
- Thomas Washington Daniel (born 1966)

== Popular culture ==
Italian dress designer Micol Fontana, who designed Truman’s wedding gown, was invited to be a surprise guest on the TV show What's My Line? in New York City, just six days before the Truman/Daniel wedding on April 21, 1956, in Independence, Missouri.

== Later years and death ==
In later life, Truman lived in her Park Avenue home. She died on January 29, 2008, in Chicago (to which she was relocating to be closer to her son Clifton). She was said to have been suffering from "a simple infection" and had been breathing with the assistance of a respirator. Her ashes and those of her husband are interred in Independence in her parents' burial plot on the grounds of the Truman Library.

== Written works ==
=== Non-fiction ===
| Book | Year | Notes |
|---|---|---|
| Souvenir: Margaret Truman's Own Story | 1956 | OCLC 629282 |
| White House Pets | 1969 | OCLC 70279 |
| Harry S. Truman | 1973 | ISBN 0-688-00005-3 |
| Women of Courage | 1976 | ISBN 0-688-03038-6 |
| Letters From Father: The Truman Family's Personal Correspondence | 1981 | ISBN 0-87795-313-9 |
| Bess W. Truman | 1986 | ISBN 0-02-529470-9 |
| Where The Buck Stops: The Personal and Private Writings of Harry S. Truman | 1989 | ISBN 0-446-51494-2 |
| First Ladies | 1995 | ISBN 0-679-43439-9 |
| The President's House: 1800 to the Present | 2003 | ISBN 0-345-47248-9 |

=== Fiction ===
The Capital Crimes series:

| Book | Year | Notes |
|---|---|---|
| Murder in the White House | 1980 | ISBN 0-87795-245-0 |
| Murder on Capitol Hill | 1981 | ISBN 0-87795-312-0 |
| Murder in the Supreme Court | 1982 | ISBN 0-87795-384-8 |
| Murder in the Smithsonian | 1983 | ISBN 0-87795-475-5 |
| Murder on Embassy Row | 1984 | ISBN 0-87795-594-8 |
| Murder at the FBI | 1985 | ISBN 0-87795-680-4 |
| Murder in Georgetown | 1986 | ISBN 0-87795-797-5 |
| Murder in the CIA | 1987 | ISBN 0-394-55795-6 |
| Murder at the Kennedy Center | 1989 | ISBN 0-394-57602-0 |
| Murder at the National Cathedral | 1990 | ISBN 0-394-57603-9 |
| Murder at the Pentagon | 1992 | ISBN 0-394-57604-7 |
| Murder on the Potomac | 1994 | ISBN 0-679-43309-0 |
| Murder at the National Gallery | 1996 | ISBN 0-679-43530-1 |
| Murder in the House | 1997 | ISBN 0-679-43528-X |
| Murder at the Watergate | 1998 | ISBN 0-679-43535-2 |
| Murder at the Library of Congress | 1999 | ISBN 0-375-50068-5 |
| Murder in Foggy Bottom | 2000 | ISBN 0-375-50069-3 |
| Murder in Havana | 2001 | ISBN 0-375-50070-7 |
| Murder at Ford's Theatre | 2002 | ISBN 0-345-44489-2 |
| Murder at Union Station | 2004 | ISBN 0-345-44490-6 |
| Murder at the Washington Tribune | 2005 | ISBN 0-345-47819-3 |
| Murder at the Opera | 2006 | ISBN 0-345-47821-5 |
| Murder on K Street | 2007 | ISBN 0-345-49886-0 |
| Murder inside the Beltway | 2008 | ISBN 0-345-49888-7 |
| Monument to Murder | 2011 | ISBN 978-0-7653-2609-6 |

As of 2021, six further novels in the series had been published under Truman's name as "with Donald Bain" or "with John Land."

Awards and achievements
| Preceded by Charles E. Wilson | Cover of Time Magazine; February 26, 1951 | Succeeded by Lt. Gen. Matthew B. Ridgway |
