= Independence and the Opening of the West =

Mural by Thomas Hart Benton in Independence, Missouri

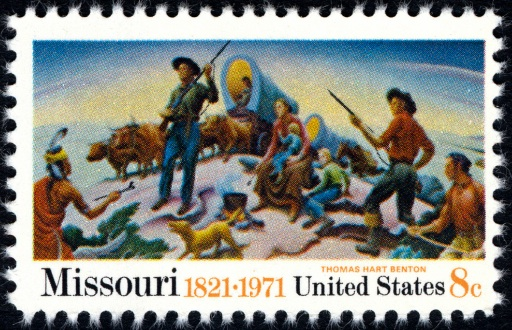
A 1971 postage stamp features a pioneer family from the mural.

Independence and the Opening of the West is a 1961 mural by the American painter Thomas Hart Benton, located inside the Harry S. Truman Presidential Library and Museum in Independence, Missouri. It depicts Independence and its people during three decades, from 1817 to 1847.

The painting was commissioned by David Lloyd, the executive director of the Harry S. Truman Library, Inc. Benton was at the time out of favor among the art institutions, but still well known as a mural painter. When offered the job, he was immediately drawn to the subject because of Independence's place in American folklore, as the last city before the frontier.

A detail from the painting is featured on a stamp issued by the United States Post Office Department in 1971 to commemorate the 150th anniversary of Missouri's statehood.
