= Bess Truman =

First Lady of the United States from 1945 to 1953

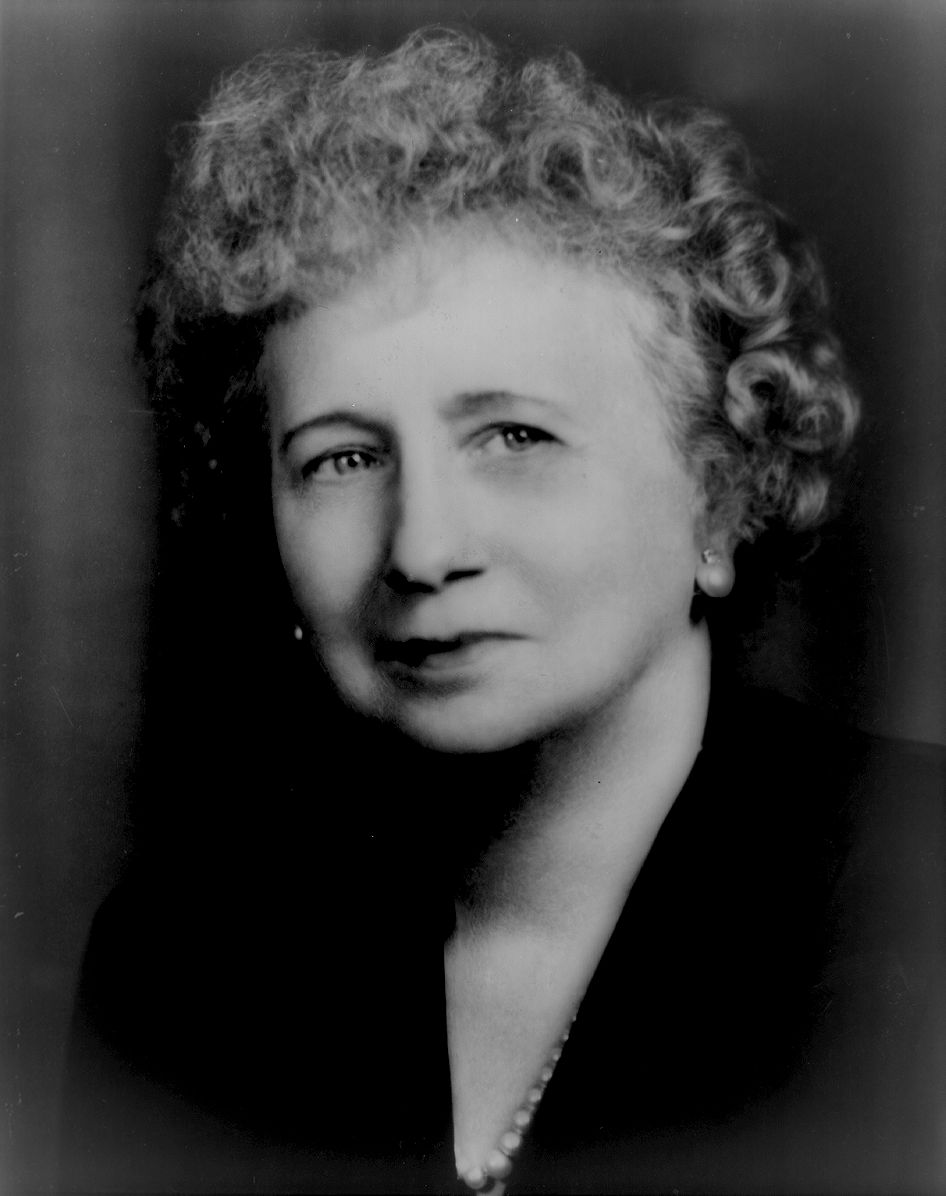
- Portrait, c. 1940s

First Lady of the United States
- In role April 12, 1945 – January 20, 1953
- President: Harry S. Truman
- Preceded by: Eleanor Roosevelt
- Succeeded by: Mamie Eisenhower

Second Lady of the United States
- In role January 20, 1945 – April 12, 1945
- Vice President: Harry S. Truman
- Preceded by: Ilo Wallace
- Succeeded by: Jane Hadley Barkley

Personal details
- Born: Elizabeth Virginia Wallace; February 13, 1885 Independence, Missouri, U.S.
- Died: October 18, 1982 (aged 97) Independence, Missouri, U.S.
- Resting place: Harry S. Truman Presidential Library and Museum
- Party: Democratic
- Spouse: Harry S. Truman (m. 1919; died 1972)
- Children: Margaret Truman

Elizabeth Virginia Truman (née Wallace; February 13, 1885 – October 18, 1982) was First Lady of the United States from 1945 to 1953 as the wife of President Harry S. Truman. She had previously served as Second Lady of the United States from January to April 1945. At 97 years, 247 days, she was the longest-lived first and second spouse.

She was born in Independence, Missouri, where she kept a home her entire life. She had known Harry since they were children, though she did not return his affections until adulthood. She was strongly affected by the suicide of her father when she was 18, which shaped her opinions about privacy from the public eye and the responsibilities of a spouse. Bess and Harry married in 1919, and Bess spent the following years managing the Truman household and working in her husband's offices as his political career advanced. She was apprehensive about Harry running for vice president in 1944, and she was deeply upset when he ascended to the presidency the following year.

As first lady, Bess avoided social obligations and media attention whenever possible, and she made regular excursions to her home in Independence. She chose not to continue in the regular press conferences carried out by her predecessor Eleanor Roosevelt, believing that her responsibility as a wife was to keep her opinions private. Her influence on her husband's presidency came about in their private conversations, as he would consult her about most major decisions during his presidency. She was also prominent in his reelection campaign, making regular appearances for crowds as he toured the United States. She was greatly relieved when Harry chose not to run for another term in 1952. After her tenure as first lady, Bess lived in retirement at her home in Independence until her death in 1982.

Truman was generally popular among her contemporaries, but her lifelong devotion to privacy has allowed for limited historical analysis. She refused to provide information about herself or her beliefs to journalists during her lifetime, and she destroyed many of her letters after leaving the White House. There is no consensus among historians on her performance as first lady or to what extent she influenced her husband's presidency.

== Early life ==
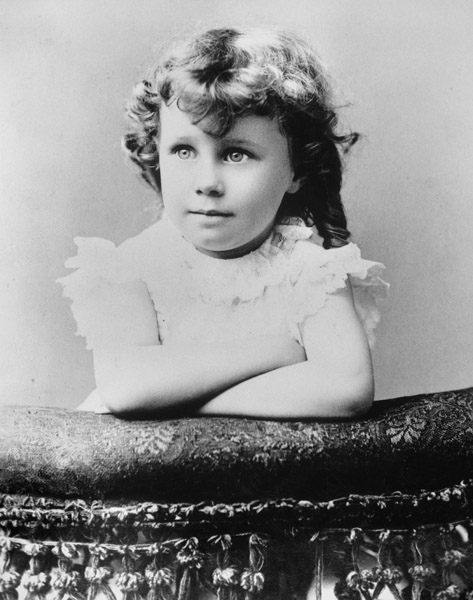
Portrait of Bess Wallace at age four

Bess was born as Elizabeth Virginia Wallace on February 13, 1885, in Independence, Missouri, to Margaret or "Madge" Elizabeth Gates (1862–1952) and David Willock Wallace. Margaret was the daughter of a businessman, and David was a local politician. Bess was known as Bessie during her childhood, and she had three younger brothers (Frank, George, and Fred). Her only sister died in infancy. As a child, Bess had a reputation as a tomboy due in part to her propensity for sports, including golf, tennis, horseback riding, shot put, basketball, baseball, and ice skating. She learned dancing and etiquette, and she attended town balls and hayrides of the town's aristocracy.

In 1903, when Bess was 18, her father died by suicide. According to the biographer David McCullough, the cause for his suicide is unknown, with speculation ranging from depression to mounting debts. Bess spent the following hours pacing silently in her backyard, first alone and then joined by her closest friend Mary Paxton. Her father's suicide was scandalous, and the family moved to Colorado Springs, Colorado, for a year to avoid the community's attention. Bess later attempted to keep this part of her life a secret. After her father's death, Bess took responsibility for raising her younger brothers, and the family moved into the home of her maternal grandparents. Bess's mother became a lifelong recluse, and the ordeal imprinted upon Bess the belief that a husband and wife should be close partners in everything they do. She refused to speak about her father for the rest of her life.

After graduating from Independence High School (now known as William Chrisman High School) she studied at Miss Barstow's Finishing School for Girls in Kansas City, Missouri. Bess played on the women's basketball team, and she studied literature and French. As a young woman, Bess enjoyed expressing herself through fashion and hats; in the words of a friend, "Bess always had more stylish hats than the rest of us did, or she wore them with more style." After returning from school, she resumed her role as the head of the family, and she became involved with the community through her bridge club and her charity work with the Needlework Guild. It was at this time that she began going by Bess rather than Bessie.

== Marriage and family ==
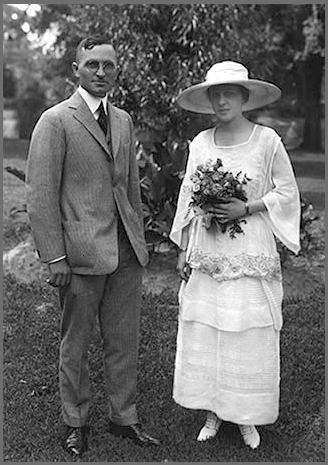
Harry and Bess Truman on their wedding day, June 28, 1919.

Harry S. Truman met Bess soon after his family moved to Independence in 1890, and the two attended school together until graduation. Many factors kept them from forming a closer bond in school, including their differences in social class and religion, Harry's time-consuming job at a drugstore, and Harry's inability to participate in athletics with Bess due to his thick glasses.They sometimes studied Latin together, and he often volunteered to carry her books, but they did not become close friends.

Bess had many suitors in the years after high school, but none won her love. In 1910, long after their time in school, Harry volunteered to return a cake plate to the Wallaces as an excuse to speak to Bess. They reconnected and began a courtship. Harry was insecure about his lack of money, and he attempted to impress Bess by purchasing tickets to shows and building her a tennis court. Bess' mother disapproved of the relationship.

Harry proposed in 1911 in a long letter, which he later admitted was clumsily written, but Bess turned him down. He later said that he intended to propose again when he would be earning more money than a farmer. They became informally engaged in November 1913, though Harry still doubted himself regarding his finances. Over the following years, the couple regularly corresponded while Harry traveled throughout the United States for his work in mining and petroleum. Bess wished to marry before Harry departed to fight in World War I in 1917, but he refused to risk making her a young widow. She worked to support the war effort while he was gone by selling war bonds, and she served on a committee for entertaining soldiers.

Bess and Harry married on June 28, 1919, at Trinity Episcopal Church in Independence. The newlyweds honeymooned in Chicago and Detroit and then moved into Bess's childhood home so she could care for her mother. During their marriage, Bess tried in vain to teach her husband the etiquette with which she had been raised. Their only child, Margaret, was born in 1924. Bess's two previous pregnancies had ended in miscarriages. Bess became the primary authority figure in Margaret's life, while Harry would spoil her.

Bess held several jobs working with her husband, which provided more income for the Truman family. She was accounts manager at Truman-Jacobsen Haberdashery from 1919 to 1922, when the business went bankrupt. After Harry was elected county judge in the eastern district of Jackson County, she worked as his aide from 1922 to 1924 and from 1926 to 1934. Corruption and violence were prominent in Jackson County politics at the time, and working with her husband in his early political career caused her great distress, including when they feared a plot to kidnap their young daughter. In addition to helping Harry in his political work, Bess also managed the family's household and finances. As part of her social life, Bess helped found the Junior Service League of Independence and a chapter of the Daughters of the American Revolution.

== Move to Washington, D.C. ==
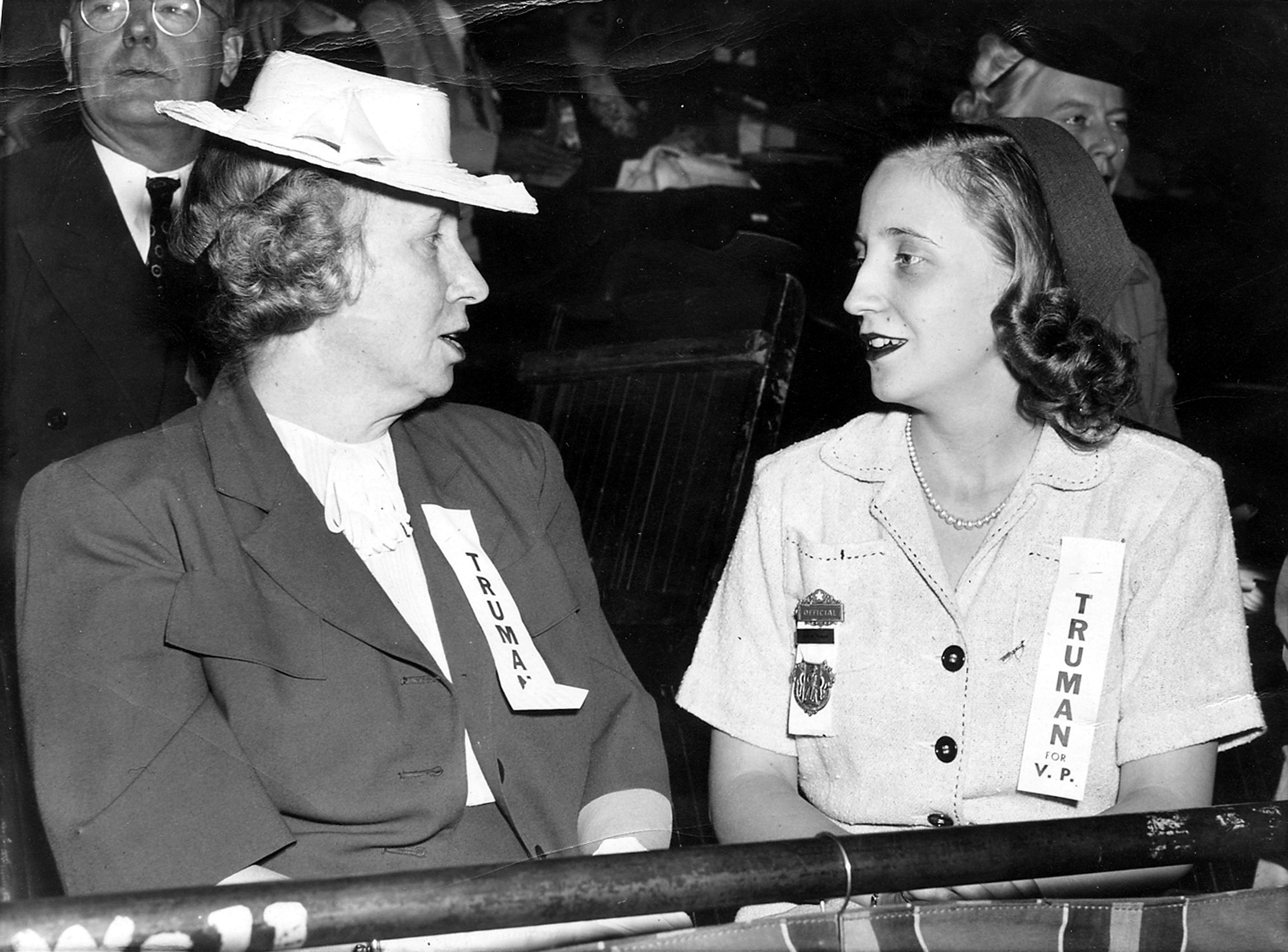
Bess and Margaret Truman at the 1944 Democratic National Convention

When Harry was elected as a senator from Missouri in 1934, Bess stayed in Missouri with her mother for the first year. After visiting Harry, she decided to stay, and the family moved to Washington, D.C. While Congress was in session during the first half of each year, they would live in rented apartments in Washington. When the session ended, they would return to Independence for the rest of the year. While her husband was in the Senate, Bess became a member of the Congressional Club, the P.E.O. Sisterhood, the H Street United Service Organization, and the Red Cross work of the group informally known as the "Senate Wives". She joined her husband's staff as a clerk, answering personal mail and editing committee reports when he became chairman of the Senate Special Committee to Investigate the National Defense Program. She developed relationships with the wives of senators and cabinet members, though she did not attend the meetings of senators' wives, as she found them boring. During her husband's political career, she helped him write his speeches, though she refused to give any of her own.

In 1944, Harry was offered the Democratic nomination for Vice President of the United States. He had not sought the position, and it was a surprise to the Trumans when it was offered. When the position had previously been suggested to him, he had dismissed the idea out of concern for Bess and Margaret. When Harry accepted the role of vice president to President Franklin D. Roosevelt, Bess was not entirely pleased. She wanted to return to their life in Missouri, and she also feared that Roosevelt would die, which would make her husband the president. Bess's position on Harry's staff was controversial during the campaign, but he retained her during the campaign and during his vice presidency. After the Democratic ticket won the election and Harry was sworn in as vice president, Bess became Second Lady of the United States. She found herself saddled with the associated social responsibilities, attending many events as a representative of the Roosevelts, often multiple times in one day. Bess served as second lady for 82 days before President Roosevelt died and her husband ascended to the presidency.

== First Lady of the United States ==
=== Social role ===
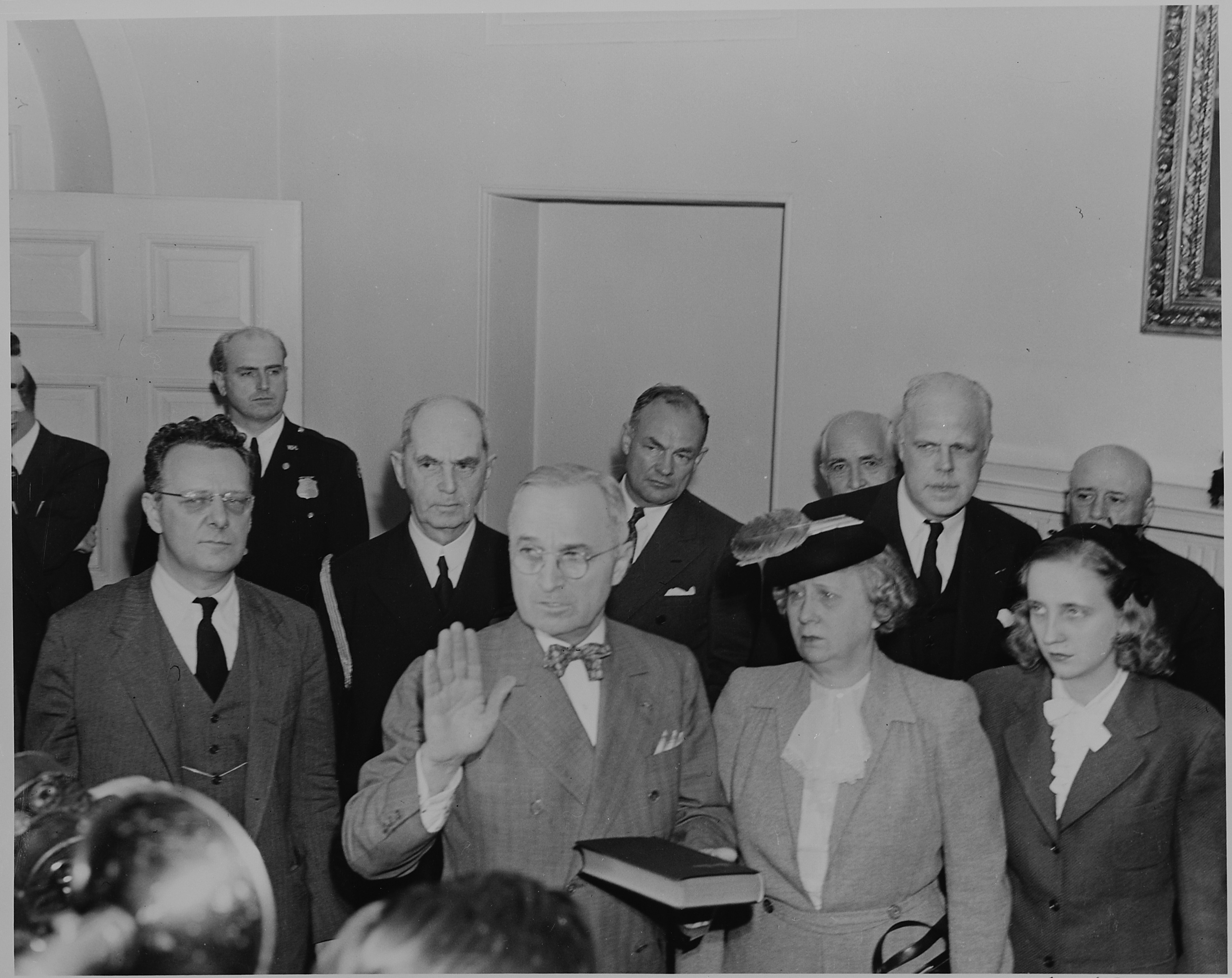
President Truman takes the oath of office next to his wife Bess and daughter Margaret on April 12, 1945

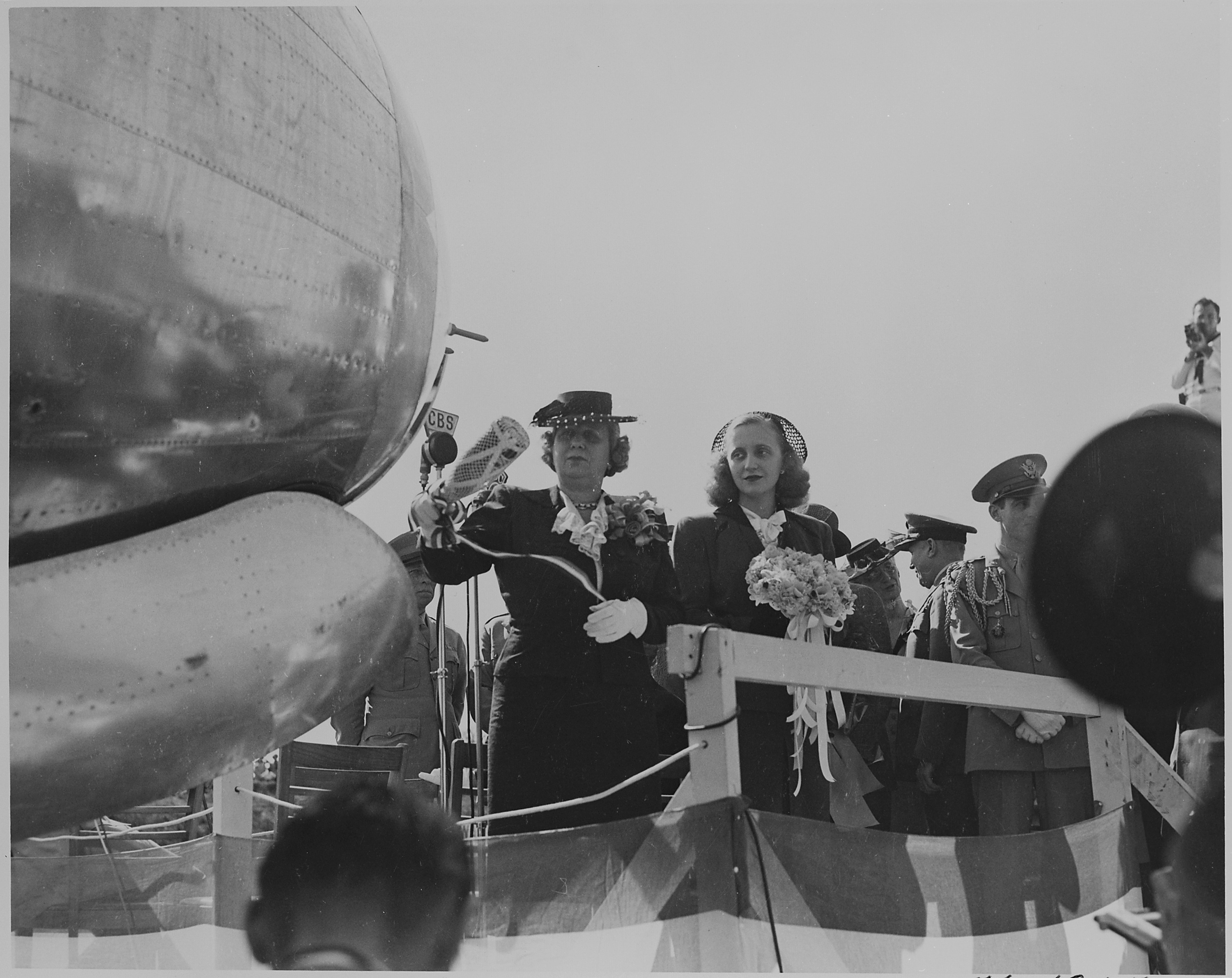
Bess Truman swinging a champagne bottle to christen a plane in 1945

President Roosevelt died on April 12, 1945, immediately ascending Harry Truman to become the President of the United States and Bess Truman the First Lady of the United States. Bess reportedly wept when she first heard the news. After making arrangements for her mother, Bess' first act as first lady was to give her condolences to the widowed Eleanor Roosevelt shortly before attending her husband's inauguration. They moved into Blair House on April 16, allowing Eleanor time to vacate the White House, and they occupied the White House on May 7. Bess had only limited social responsibilities during her first months as first lady, as the nation was in the midst of World War II and in mourning of President Roosevelt. She stayed in the White House until the end of the month before making her first return trip to Independence.

After the end of World War II, Bess was responsible for restoring the White House social season, and she organized the White House's receptions and events. She was inspired by the history of the White House and that of the Monroe administration in particular. She chose to host a more limited social season in response to postwar food shortages, replacing large dinners with informal luncheons. She emphasized courteousness and respect for all of her guests, including political opponents and others that she disliked. Bess received about one hundred letters each day, and she spent much time replying to each one. She also maintained some social obligations in Washington society, including regular attendance of luncheons in her honor.

Bess felt great anxiety at public events and wished to avoid being the center of attention. She underwent a humiliating experience a few weeks into her tenure as first lady when she was asked to christen airplanes by striking champagne bottles against them. The first bottle had not been scored to allow for an easy break, causing Bess to ineffectually strike the bottle against the plane's hull several times amid a crowd of spectators and reporters. Harry would tease her about this event, and she would eventually join the family in laughing at the footage.

Bess found the White House's lack of privacy distasteful. As her husband put it later, she was "not especially interested" in the "formalities and pomp or the artificiality" that surrounded the presidential family. Though she steadfastly fulfilled the social obligations of her position, she did only what she thought was necessary. She resisted any changes to her lifestyle, often handling bookkeeping, dusting, and other chores on her own, though she did enjoy having domestic servants. She dressed simply, preferring conservative gowns and suits rather than more elaborate dresses. When the White House was rebuilt during Harry's second term, the family lived in Blair House and kept their social life to a minimum. The responsibility of finding new venues for larger events fell to Bess.

=== Press relations ===
The contrast with Bess's activist predecessor Eleanor Roosevelt was considerable. Unlike Roosevelt, Bess held only one press conference after many requests from the media. Inquiries to the first lady consisted of written questions in advance and the written replies were mostly monosyllabic along with many no comments. When asked why she did not want to give press conferences she replied "I am not the one who is elected. I have nothing to say to the public." Bess did not support advancing women's role in politics, and she believed that there would never be a woman president. She is quoted as saying that a woman's role in public is to "sit beside her husband, be silent, and make sure her hat is on straight". Bess's response to whether she wanted her daughter Margaret to become president was "most definitely not." Her reply to what she wanted to do after her husband left office was "return to Independence".

Bess maintained a limited association with women journalists on the advice of her husband's press secretary, but she did not provide them with information. She did allow reporters to have mimeographed copies of her schedule, becoming the first first lady to do so. Part of the reason for her reclusive behavior may have been a fear that her father's suicide would be publicized, though it would not be public knowledge until after her death. Press briefings would often be given on Bess' behalf by her social secretary Edith Benham Helm and personal secretary Reathel Odum. Her limited interaction with the media surprised many journalists who had grown accustomed to regular coverage of her predecessor. Others approved of her behavior, feeling that her predecessor had overstepped in the role of first lady.

=== Political influence ===
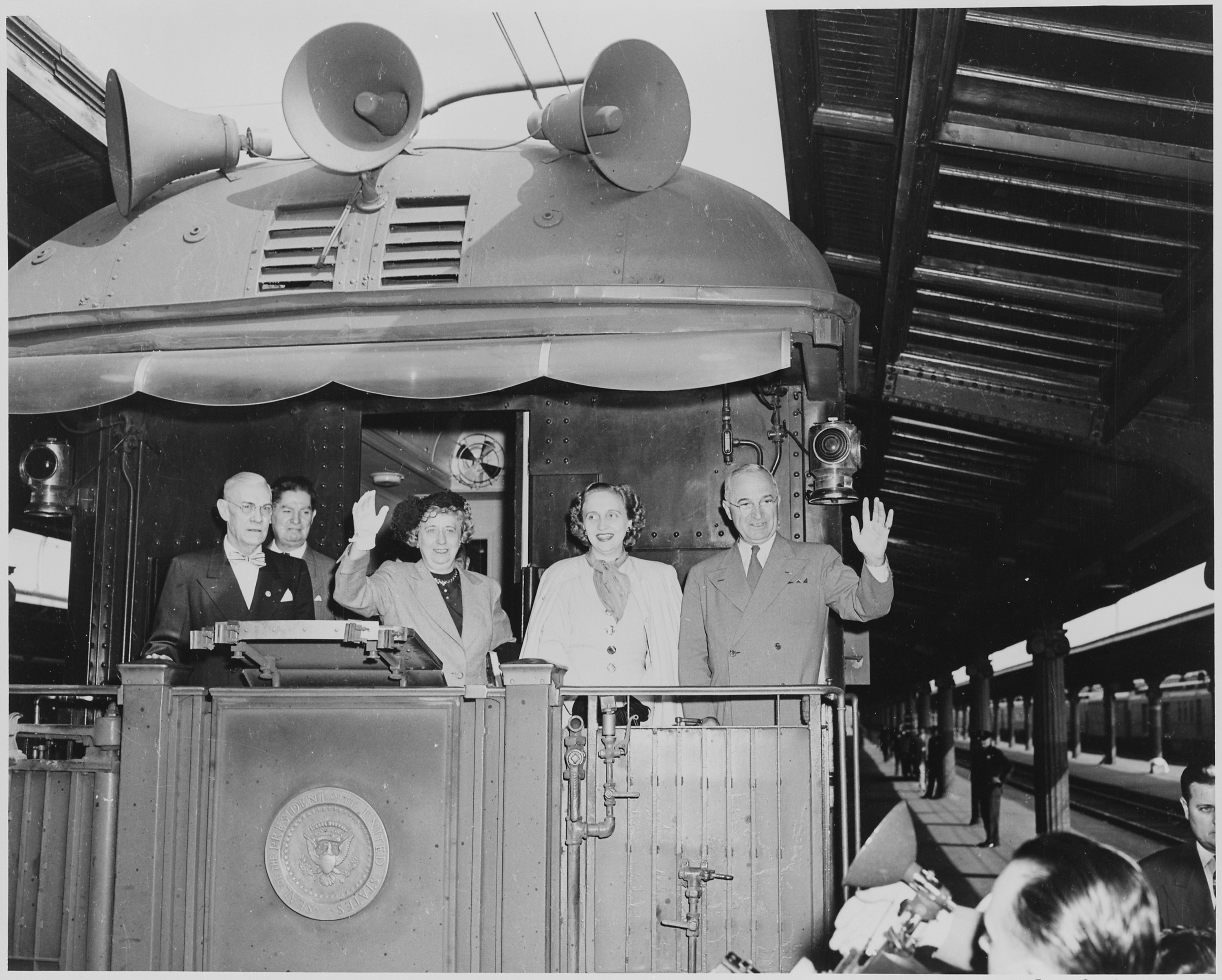
Bess Truman waving with her husband after returning from a campaign trip in 1948

Privately, Bess was an unofficial advisor to her husband. She never told him what to do as president, but she often offered her opinion on matters he was unsure of. Bess would also assist Harry with his speeches, including his speech on the Truman Doctrine. In addition to speeches, Bess reviewed and commented on Harry's work at the end of every day, and played an influential role in his 1948 campaign. Harry would later say that he asked her input on major issues, including the Marshall Plan and entry into the Korean War. Many of Bess' ideas became government initiatives, including the use of theatrical companies abroad to improve foreign relations and the involvement of the National Institutes of Health in an effort to combat disease. She was also the one to suggest appointing Charlie Ross as the White House Press Secretary.

Bess was involved with a controversy while she was first lady in attending a reception for the Daughters of the American Revolution. The organization had refused to allow Hazel Scott, a black pianist, to perform at DAR Constitution Hall, and Bess' attendance was seen as an endorsement of this stance. Scott's husband, Representative Adam Clayton Powell, was banned from the White House after calling Bess the "Last Lady of the Land". Bess caused a similar controversy when she attended a play at George Washington University despite an ongoing protest of the ban on black audience members. Bess felt that a first lady's actions should not address political issues, and she considered her personal time to be entirely separate from her political role. She was upset with being compared to segregationists, furthering her resolve to avoid the public for the rest of her husband's presidency.

As First Lady, Bess served as Honorary President of the Girl Scouts, the Woman's National Democratic Club, and the Washington Animal Rescue League. She was Honorary Chairman of the American Red Cross. She worked with various organizations, but she never adopted a group or cause to focus on, as many First Ladies do. She was active in her husband's reelection campaign in 1948, traveling the country with Harry in a whistle-stop train tour in which he introduced her to crowds as his "Boss". Her presence, along with that of her daughter, contributed to Harry's image as a family man. She also sat in on and contributed to meetings among his advisors. Four years later, when Harry was uncertain about another reelection campaign, Bess' desire to return home was a major factor in his decision not to run. When Harry announced that he would not run for reelection in 1952, one of Bess' friends described her as trying not to show how gleeful she was. After her retirement, however, she would say that she enjoyed the culture and political happenings of Washington.

=== Personal life ===
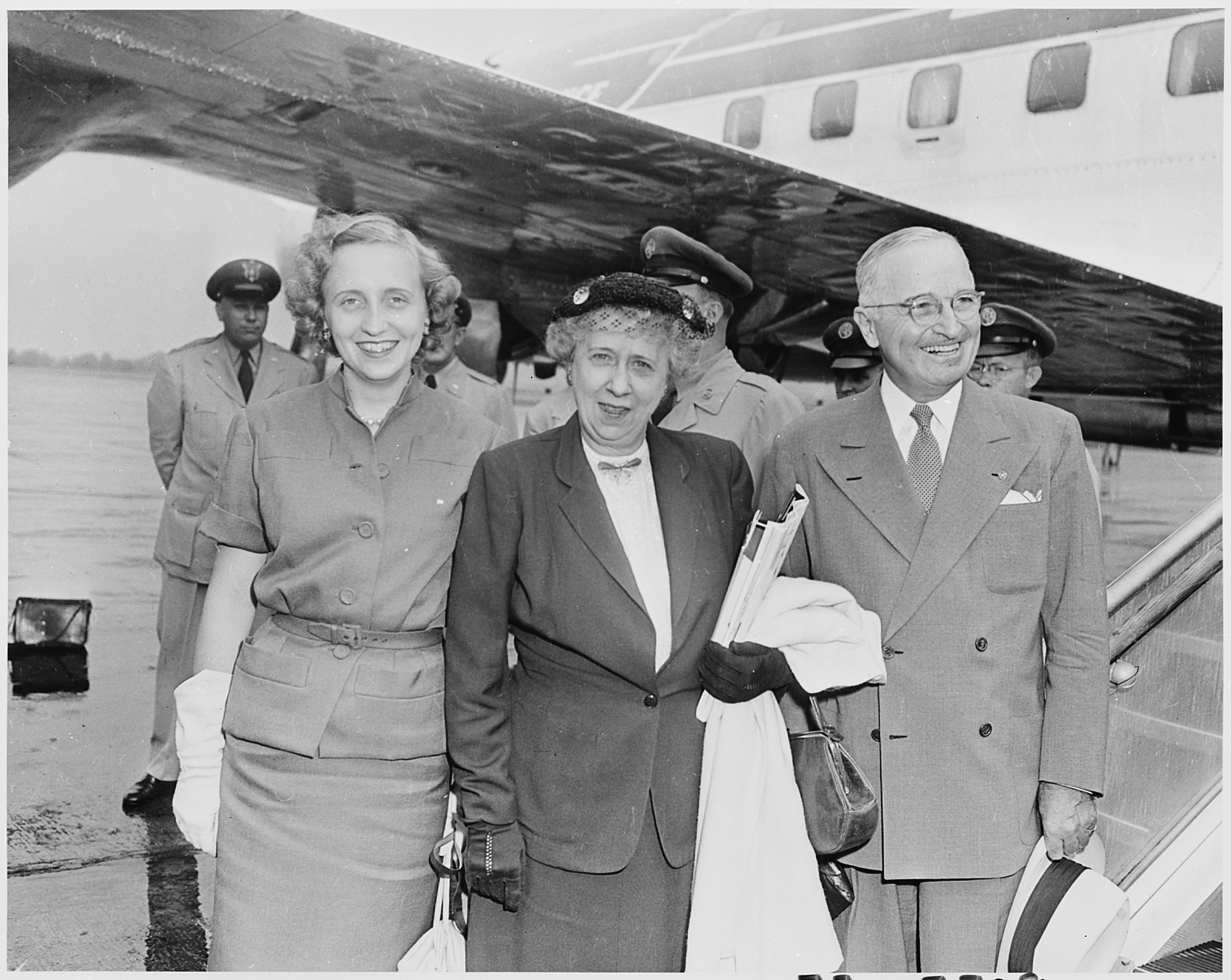
The Trumans in 1951

Despite criticism of her regular absences from Washington, she spent a significant amount of time as first lady in Independence. Bess allowed her daughter to fulfill the social responsibilities of the first lady during her absences. Even when she was in Washington, most of her time was dedicated to her family. She continued to care for her mother until the latter's death in 1952. When Bess was in Washington, she held a weekly Spanish language class for her and her local friends. She also hosted her bridge club from home in Independence, bringing them out to the White House and leading them on a tour of Washington.

During the first months of her husband's presidency, Bess felt neglected. She made Harry aware of these feelings, but his schedule prevented them from spending as much time together as they were accustomed to. This caused a great argument between the couple in December 1945 after Harry arrived for Christmas. After returning to Washington, he wrote her a harshly worded letter only to call Margaret and have her burn it before Bess could read it. The couple reconciled after this incident, and Harry ensured that she had an increased role in his administration. White House staff and visitors often described the Trumans as a close family. Their close relationship as a family was apparent, such that the staff affectionately dubbed Harry, Bess, and Margaret the "Three Musketeers".

== Later life ==
An outtake of an interview with Bess Truman c. 1961–1963

After leaving the White House in 1953, the Trumans went back to Independence and the family home at 219 North Delaware Street, where the former president worked on building his library and writing his memoirs. Upon arriving home, they were met with a large crowd of admirers, which Bess thoroughly enjoyed. In 1955, the Trumans went on vacation at a resort owned by Edwin W. Pauley in Coconut Island, Hawaii. That summer, they went on a road trip across the continental United States, but they were impeded by the attention they received everywhere they went.

The Trumans toured Europe in 1956 and again in 1958. Bess fully recovered following a 1959 mastectomy in which doctors removed a large, but benign, tumor. The Trumans made their first return to the White House in 1961 on the invitation of the Kennedys. When President Lyndon Johnson signed Medicare into law in 1965, the Trumans were the first senior citizens to receive Medicare cards, presented to them by Johnson at the Truman Library. At the time of her husband's death in December 1972, at age 88, she was 87, making them the oldest couple to have occupied the White House up to that time.

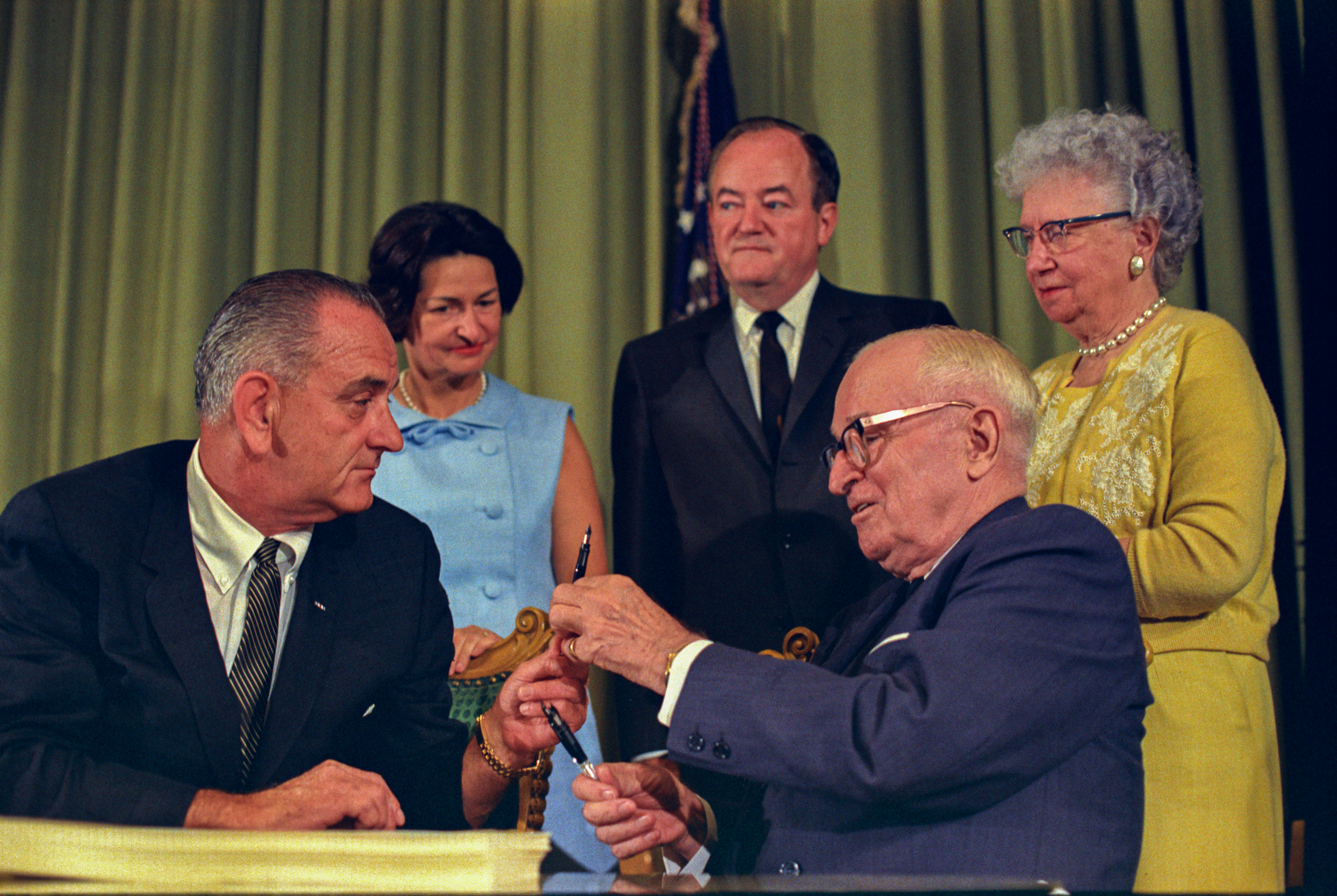
Bess Truman (right) watching as President Johnson signs Medicare into law

Bess was dismayed in the 1972 presidential election, as she opposed the left-wing policies of 1972 presidential candidate George McGovern, and she felt that Thomas Eagleton (who represented Missouri in the U.S. Senate) had been unfairly treated when he was removed from the 1972 Democratic ticket. She agreed to be the honorary chairman of Eagleton's Senate reelection campaign in 1974, and she held a similar position for Stuart Symington in 1976. She also supported Congressional candidate Ike Skelton due to the close relations of their families. While Harry's presidency had been heavily scrutinized after leaving office, Bess lived long enough to see a historical reassessment in the 1970s that portrayed him in a more positive light. Jimmy Carter sought her endorsement in the 1980 presidential election, though he did not receive it.

Bess continued to live quietly in Independence for the last decade of her life, being visited by her daughter and grandchildren. She received many visitors in Independence, sometimes upwards of a hundred in one week, and she often demonstrated a keen memory for names and details about people she had met in the past. Arthritis necessitated that she use a wheelchair in her final years, and she continued in her less active hobbies, reading mystery novels and closely following the Kansas City Royals. She would also reread an old love letter from her husband every day.

Bess died on October 18, 1982, from congestive heart failure at the age of 97, and a private funeral service was held on October 21. Afterwards, she was buried beside her husband in the courtyard of the Harry S. Truman Library in Independence, Missouri. She remains the longest-lived first lady in United States history at 97, followed by Rosalynn Carter at 96, Nancy Reagan and Lady Bird Johnson at 94, Betty Ford at 93, and Barbara Bush at 92. Truman is also the longest lived second lady in United States history.

== Legacy ==
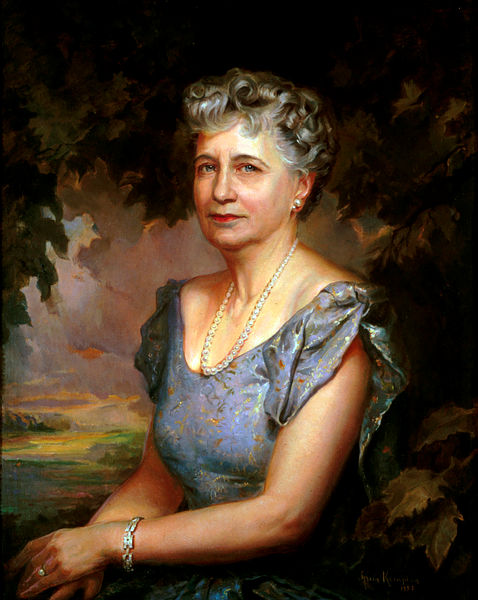
Portrait of Bess Truman by Greta Kempton

Truman kept a low profile during her tenure as first lady, and commentators often emphasized how little was known about her. Many contemporary reports about her contained inaccuracies and misrepresentations based on the very little that reporters could glean. Her refusal to discuss her political beliefs led the public to believe that she had no strong opinions of her own.Bess destroyed many of her own letters after leaving the White House with the intention of making historical analysis of her life more difficult. Most of her surviving correspondences are those that were preserved by her daughter. She made only one television appearance, also on the initiative of her daughter. Much of the historic record about Bess is derived from a biography written by her daughter and letters written to her by Harry. For this reason, historical analysis of Bess Truman varies considerably. Siena Research Institute polling ranked her as the 11th best out of 37 first ladies in 1993, but its subsequent edition in 2003 ranked her as 20th best out of 38.

She was often contrasted with her predecessor, Eleanor Roosevelt. While Roosevelt was active in politics and an influential public figure, Bess' influence was largely felt behind the scenes at the White House. She would chide her husband when he lost his temper, to the point where her "you didn't have to say that" became an inside joke among the White House staff. Bess was popular among the staff, with whom she enjoyed friendly relations in contrast to her shy personality in public. Her input may have influenced her husband's decision making, but the extent of her role is lost to history.

== See also ==
- Bibliography of United States presidential spouses and first ladies

Honorary titles
Preceded by Ilo Wallace	Second Lady of the United States; 1945	Vacant Title next held by Jane Barkley
Preceded by Eleanor Roosevelt	First Lady of the United States; 1945–1953	Succeeded by Mamie Eisenhower
