= Trinity Episcopal Church (Independence, Missouri) =

Historic church in Missouri, United States

- U.S. National Register of Historic Places
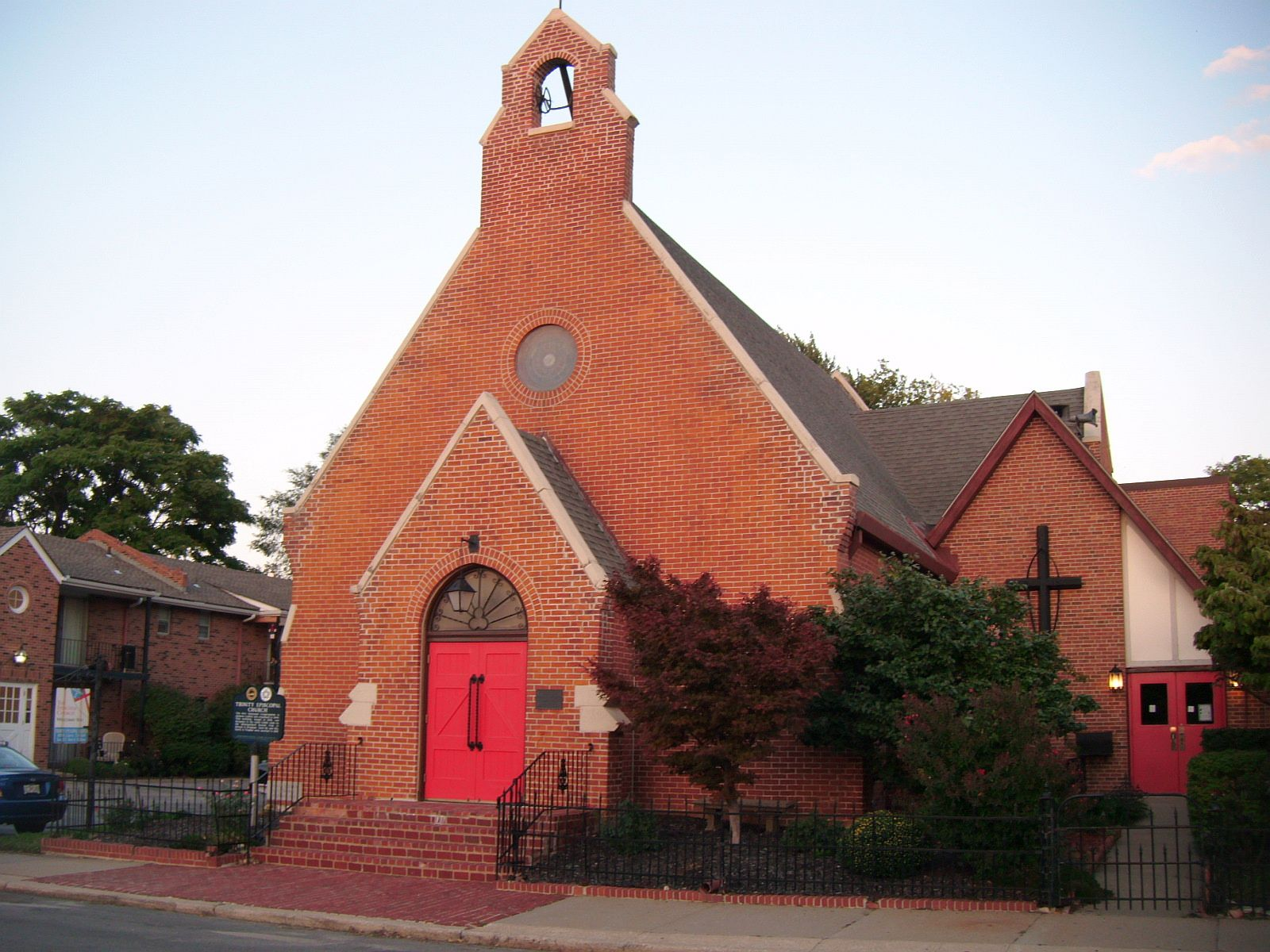

- Location within Missouri Location within the United States
- Location: 409 N. Liberty St., Independence, Missouri
- Coordinates: 39°5′41″N 94°24′59″W
- Area: 0.1 acres (0.040 ha)
- Built: 1881
- Architect: Sturgis & Brigham
- NRHP reference No.: 79001366
- Added to NRHP: April 27, 1979

Trinity Episcopal Church is a historic church at 409 North Liberty Street in Independence, Missouri.

It was built in 1881 and was added to the National Register of Historic Places in 1979.

Future US President Harry S Truman married Bess Wallace at Trinity Episcopal on June 28, 1919. The church was also the site of the 1956 wedding of their daughter, Margaret.
