= Harry S. Truman Presidential Library and Museum =

Library and museum for U.S. President Harry S. Truman, located in Missouri

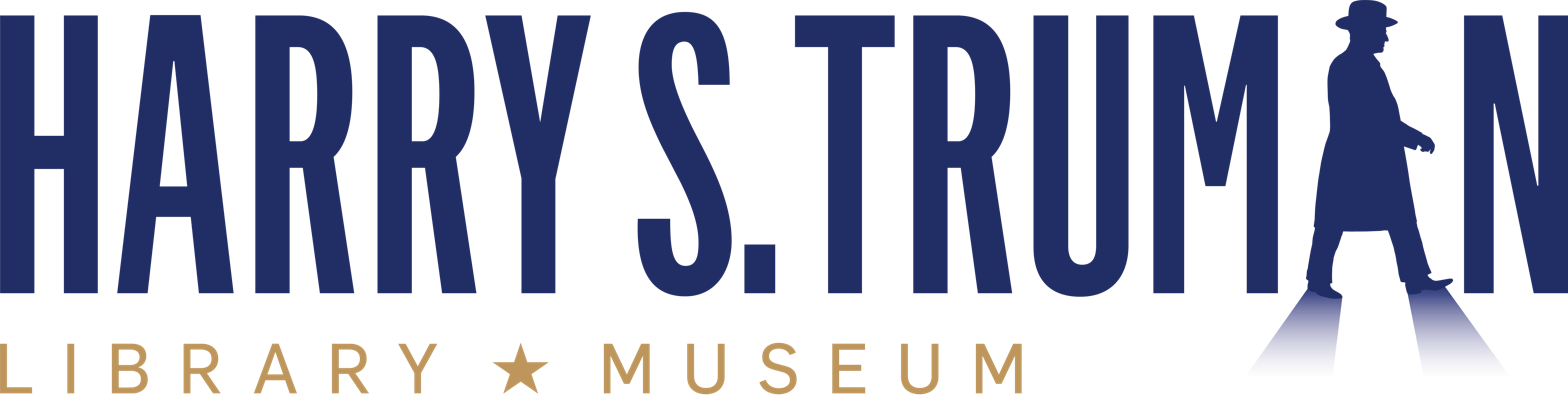

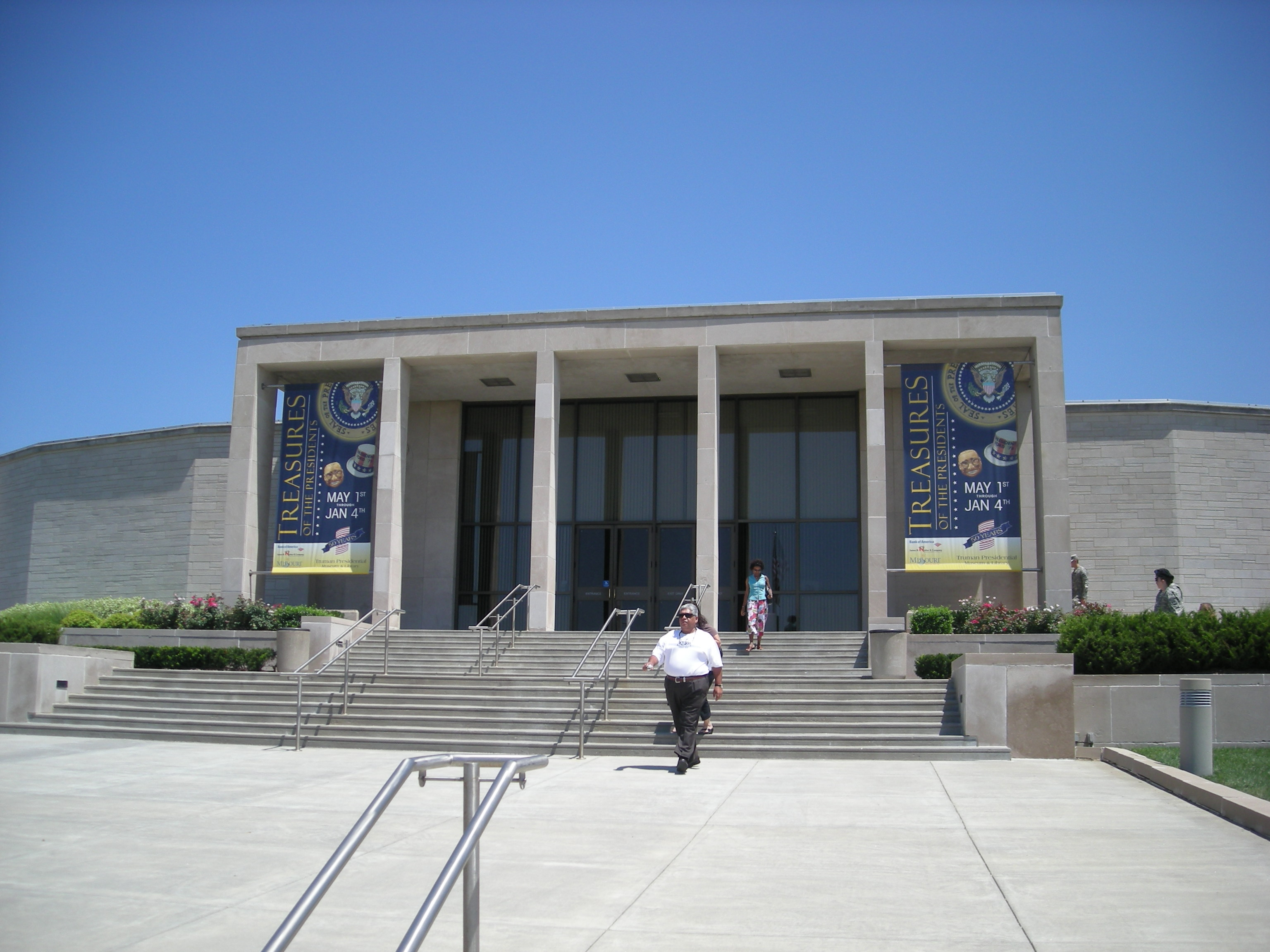
- The Harry S. Truman Presidential Library and Museum in 2007

- Location within Missouri Location within the United States
- Interactive map showing the location of Truman Presidential Library

General information
- Location: 500 West U.S. Highway 24; Independence, Missouri, U.S.
- Coordinates: 39°06′12″N 94°25′15″W
- Named for: Harry S Truman
- Inaugurated: Dedicated on July 6, 1957; 69 years ago
- Cost: $1,700,000
- Operator: National Archives and Records Administration

Design and construction
- Architects: Edward Neild (primary), Gentry and Voskamp

Website
- trumanlibrary.gov

The Harry S. Truman Presidential Library and Museum is the presidential library and resting place of Harry S. Truman, the 33rd president of the United States (1945–1953), his wife Bess and daughter Margaret, and is located on U.S. Highway 24 in Independence, Missouri. It was the first presidential library created under the provisions of the 1955 Presidential Libraries Act and is one of thirteen presidential libraries administered by the National Archives and Records Administration. The library contains approximately 178,000 photographs, 900 motion-picture films, and 5,100 audio recordings related to Truman and his era.

== History ==
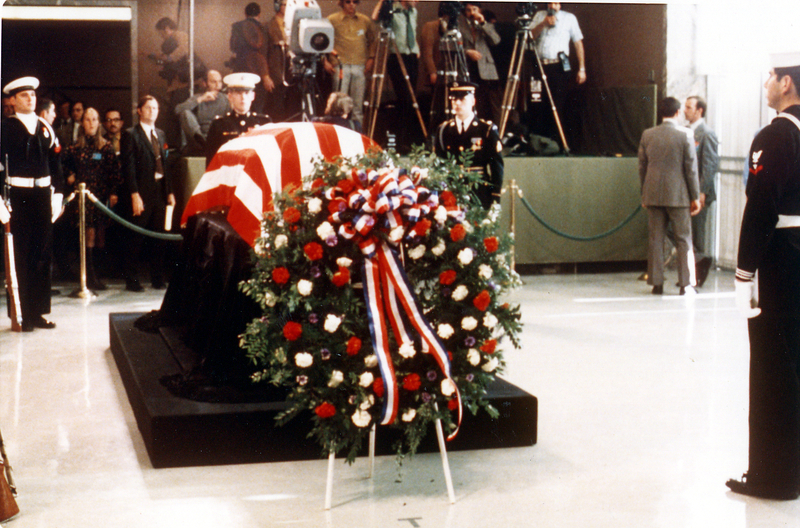
Truman's funeral service at the Truman Library, December 27, 1972. Mrs. Truman chose to have the service at the library rather than a larger, state funeral in Washington, D.C.

The library was built with private funds raised by the Harry S. Truman Library Inc., with Truman himself contributing greatly to the fundraising effort by "attending dinners, making speeches around the country, and writing thousands of letters".

Built on a hill overlooking the Kansas City skyline, on land donated by the City of Independence, it was dedicated July 6, 1957. The ceremony included the Masonic Rites of Dedication and attendance by former president Herbert Hoover (then the only living former president other than President Truman), Chief Justice Earl Warren, and former first lady Eleanor Roosevelt.

Here, President Lyndon B. Johnson signed the Medicare Act on July 30, 1965.

The museum has been victimized by significant burglaries twice.

John Wesley Snyder, Truman's Treasury Secretary and close friend, donated his personal collection of 450 rare coins to the museum in March 1962. That November, burglars stole the entire collection. None of the stolen coins have been recovered. Snyder helped coordinate an effort among 147 coin collectors to reconstruct the collection, which went back on display in 1967, at a ceremony attended by Truman.

While serving as president, Truman had received gifts of jewel encrusted swords and daggers from Saud of Saudi Arabia, then the crown prince, and Mohammad Reza Pahlavi, the last shah of Iran. He turned these items over to the National Archives and Records Administration as required by law, and they were displayed at the museum. According to the museum curator, they "had embedded diamonds and rubies and sapphires, a number of precious stones in their hilts and in their scabbards". In March 1978, burglars broached the front door of the museum, smashed showcases, and stole the three swords and two daggers, which were valued at US$1 million at that time. None of the stolen items have been recovered. In 2021, the FBI offered a reward of up to $1 million for return of the items.

On December 11, 2006, Kofi Annan gave his final speech as Secretary-General of the United Nations at the library, where he encouraged the United States to return to the multilateralist policies of Truman.

=== Design ===
The lead architect of the project was Edward F. Neild of Shreveport, Louisiana. Truman had picked Neild in the 1930s, during his time as presiding judge of Jackson County, to design the renovation of the old county courthouse in Independence and to oversee the construction of the new courthouse in Kansas City, after being favorably impressed by Neild's work on the courthouse in his native Caddo Parish. Neild was also one of the architects involved in the reconstruction of the White House during Truman's presidency.

Neild died July 6, 1955, at the Kansas City Club while working on the design. The work was completed by Alonzo H. Gentry of Gentry and Voskamp, the firm that designed Kansas City's Municipal Auditorium.

Truman had initially wanted the building to resemble his maternal grandfather Solomon Young's house in Grandview, Missouri.

In response to a New York Times review that recalled Frank Lloyd Wright influences in the library's horizontal design, Truman was reported to have said, "It's got too much of that fellow in it to suit me."

Architects Gould Evans designed a $23 million renovation of the entire facility, unveiled in 2001. The changes included the extensive use of glass in the relatively windowless structure and a significant change to the space between Truman's grave and the museum.

== Truman's activities on the premises ==
Truman actively participated in the day-to-day operation of the Library, personally training museum docents and conducting impromptu "press conferences" for visiting school students. He frequently arrived before the staff and would often answer the phone to give directions and answer questions, telling surprised callers that he was the "man himself."

His visitors included incumbent presidents Eisenhower, Kennedy, Johnson, and Nixon, former president Hoover, Jack Benny, Ginger Rogers, Robert F. Kennedy, Thomas Hart Benton, and Dean Acheson.

== Truman's office ==
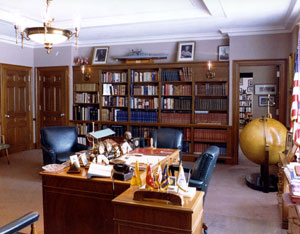
Truman's office on the premises

When Truman left the White House in 1953, he established an office in Room 1107 of the Federal Reserve Bank of Kansas City at 925 Grand Avenue. When the library opened in 1957, he transferred his office to the facility and often worked there five or six days a week. In the office, he wrote articles, letters, and his book Mr. Citizen.

In 2007, the Truman Library Institute announced a $1.6 million preservation and restoration of his working office to preserve the artifacts it contains and allow for easier public viewing. The three-stage project completed in 2009 and features an enclosed limestone pavilion for better access and viewing and an updated climate control system. The office appears today just as it did when Harry Truman died on December 26, 1972.

Long a favorite of museum visitors, the office was viewed through a window from the library's courtyard. The pavilion will also allow for an interpretive exhibit describing the office.

== Truman's funeral services ==
Funeral services for Truman were held in the Library auditorium and burial was in the courtyard. His wife, Bess Truman, was buried at his side in 1982. Their daughter, Margaret Truman Daniel, was a longtime member of the Truman Library Institute's board of directors. After her death in January 2008, Margaret's cremated remains and those of her late husband, Clifton Daniel (who died in 2000), were also interred in the library's courtyard. The president's grandson, Clifton Truman Daniel, is currently honorary co-chair of the institute's board of directors.

== Exhibits and program ==
Two floors of exhibits show his life and presidency through photographs, documents, artifacts, memorabilia, film clips and a film about Truman's life.

The library's full-sized replica of the Oval Office is a feature that has been copied by the Kennedy, Johnson, Nixon, Ford, Carter, Reagan, George H. W. Bush, Clinton, George W. Bush, and Obama libraries.

In an educational program called The White House Decision Center, school students take on the roles of President Truman and his advisors facing real-life historical decisions in a recreation of the West Wing of the White House.

== Theft of artifacts ==
In February 1978, there was an attempted break-in at the library, but a security guard was able to scare off the assailants. Several weeks later, on March 24, 1978, burglars (it is unknown whether the two break-ins were related) successfully entered the lobby of the library and stole three ceremonial swords and two daggers, which had been given as gifts to Truman from the leaders of Iran and Saudi Arabia, from a display case. The FBI has an active reward for their recovery, but to date, they have still not been found.

== Art ==
The mural Independence and the Opening of the West by Thomas Hart Benton adorns the walls of the lobby entrance. The mural, completed in 1961, was painted on site by Benton over a three-year span.

== Visitors ==
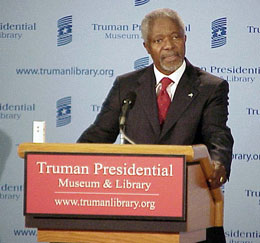
Kofi Annan speaking at the Library

Visitors after 1972 include incumbent presidents Ford, Carter, and Clinton and presidential nominees John Kerry and John McCain.

== See also ==
- Harry S. Truman National Historic Site
- Presidential memorials in the United States
- List of burial places of presidents and vice presidents of the United States
