= Grace Roosevelt McMillan =

American photographer (1911–1994)

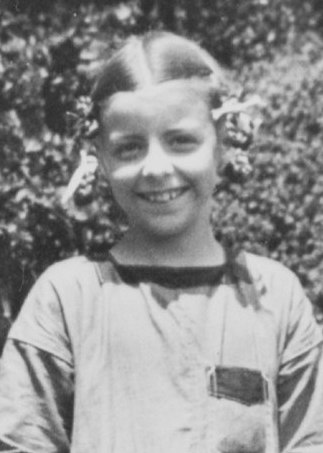
- Gracie Roosevelt in 1923.
- Born: August 17, 1911
- Died: February 15, 1994 (aged 82)
- Spouse: William McMillan
- Children: 2
- Parent(s): Theodore Roosevelt III; Eleanor Butler Alexander
- Relatives: Roosevelt family

Grace Roosevelt McMillan (born Grace Green Roosevelt; 17 August 1911 – 15 February 1994), was a photographer and first grandchild of President Theodore Roosevelt, the 26th President of the United States. She was the first child and only daughter of Theodore Roosevelt Jr. and Eleanor Butler Alexander.

== Early life ==
Grace Green Roosevelt was born in San Francisco to Theodore Roosevelt Jr. and Eleanor Butler Roosevelt. She was President Theodore Roosevelt's first grandchild. She had three younger brothers, Theodore Roosevelt III, Cornelius Van Schaack Roosevelt III, and Quentin Roosevelt II.

On March 3, 1934, Roosevelt married William McMillan, an architect.

== Career ==
McMillan attended the Sorbonne in Paris. She was a freelance photographer. She studied with the photographer J. Ghislain Lootens along with her mother. In 1986, she presented 25 of her mother's albums to the Library of Congress together with some 5,000 of her own photographs, including images of presidents and international dignitaries.

During World War II, she managed the McMillan family farm in Glyndon, Maryland while her husband served in the Navy in the Pacific theater.

McMillan was a trustee of the Baltimore Museum of Art and the Greater Baltimore Medical Center.

== Family ==
McMillan was mother to two children:

- Eleanor McMillan
- William McMillan Jr.
