= Susan Weld =

Susan Weld may refer to:

- Susan Roosevelt Weld, American educator and first lady of Massachusetts
- Susan Ker Weld, better known as Tuesday Weld
