= Hotel Sterling =

Hotel in Wilkes-Barre, Pennsylvania, US

Coordinates: 41.2481°N 75.8835°W

External videos
- The Denouement of Hotel Sterling, Antiquity Echos, 3:30, April 2012.

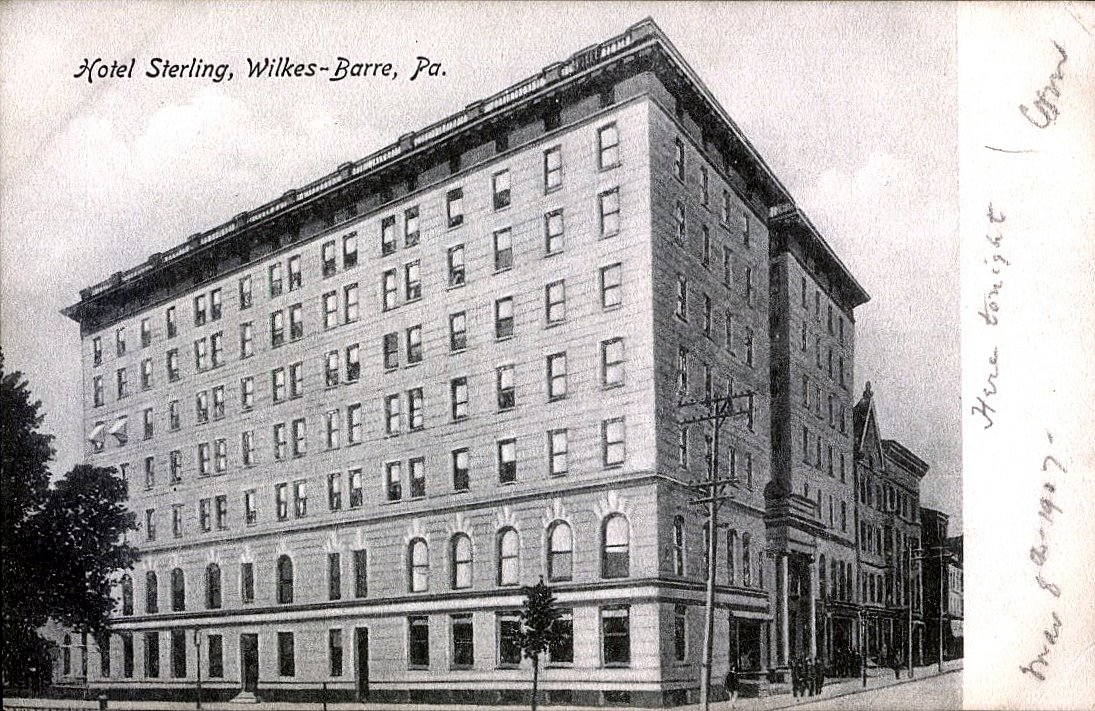
A 1907 postcard

Hotel Sterling was a hotel in downtown Wilkes-Barre, Pennsylvania, at the intersection of River Street and Market Street. It was opened in 1898 by local businesspeople, who then owned a music hall located at the site, and was named after Emma E. Sterling, whose late husband, Walter G. Sterling, a local banker and businessman, owned a share of the music hall. Emma was a driving force behind the building of the hotel.

The hotel was later expanded by Andrew Sordoni by connecting it to the Plaza Hotel in 1936. After lying abandoned for years, the non-profit organization CityVest purchased the hotel and demolished the 14-story Plaza tower portion and four-story connecting building in 2007 in an attempt to make the property more marketable to developers. Demolition of the original 1897-built building began on July 25, 2013, and finished on July 30, 2013.

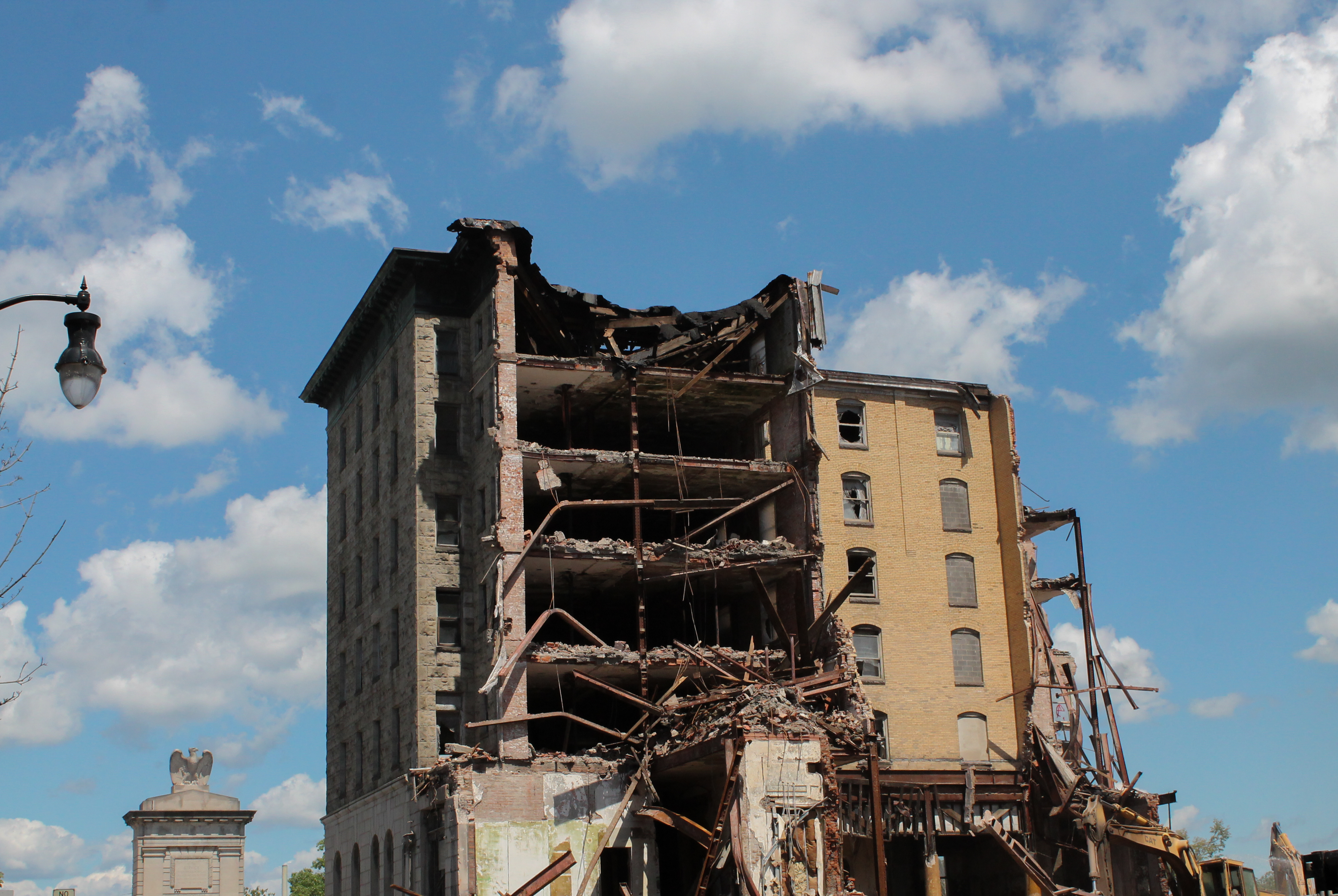
Demolition, July 2013

== History ==
The Hotel Sterling was built in 1897 and opened on August 14, 1898, by local businesspeople, who owned a music hall located at the site, and was named after Emma E. Sterling, whose late husband, Walter G. Sterling, a local banker, owned a share of the music hall. Walter G. Sterling died in 1889, and had nothing to do with the building of the Hotel Sterling, which had often been previously thought. His wife, Emma, was a driving force behind the building of the hotel, and it was thus decided to name it after her; although for a short time, the original name chosen was Algonquin, that name was never used.

Wilkes-Barre and the surrounding region was a major source of anthracite coal. Wilkes-Barre was reliant on the coal industry for the first half of the 20th century.

The hotel was designed by local architect J. W. Hawkins, whose first, European chateau-like design was rejected. It was said: "The hotel was planned as a brick Victorian Chateau whose high roof would have risen in two tall peaks, covered with several rows of gabled dormers" The design was then changed to something more modern for the time, and the building's facade facing River and Market streets was changed from brick to limestone. The remainder of the facades remained brick. The hotel was erected by W. H. Shepard & Sons of Wilkes-Barre. It is possible that a portion of the hotel may have contained some re-built external walls from the music hall, and this may account for a portion of a sign that now appears on the east side of the building after the tower and connector buildings were demolished in 2007. This truncated sign appears to say "Matinees".

The Hotel Sterling opened with approximately 175 rooms and 125 bathrooms. This suggests a large number of suites with adjoining parlor rooms. Thus each suite would equal two or more rooms along with one bathroom. It is possible that some hotel rooms had to share a bathroom, but also possible that all accommodations had a private bathroom. While still not common, it was becoming fashionable at the turn of the century that the best hotels would have a bathroom for each form of accommodation. Prior to opening, the hotel was leased for 10 years to W. A. Reist, of York, Pa., and Sylvanus Stokes, of Baltimore. These gentlemen would run the hotel, and oversaw the final fitting out of the structure as to furnishings, etc. The elegant hotel opened to great fanfare, and was instantly the largest and best hotel in the area, and among the best in the northeast United States.

By 1920, a key player in the Hotel Sterling's fortunes was Homer Mallow, who became a majority stockholder and president of the company. The hotel then became known as the Mallow-Sterling. Shortly thereafter, around 1923, a competing hotel opened just down the block on Market street: the Hotel Plaza. Designed by the New York architectural firm of Warren and Wetmore, the fourteen-story structure was twice the height of the Sterling. The Hotel Plaza would not last, however, and was acquired by the Sterling in 1927.

The Great Depression greatly disrupted the hotel's revenue, putting the Sterling in financial trouble by the mid-1930. In 1936 the hotel was purchased by Andrew Sordoni, a former state senator and construction magnate. He combined the Sterling and Plaza Tower with a four-story connector building. A long, wide hallway flowed from the original Sterling, through the connector building to the tower, and was called "Peacock Alley", after a similar area located at the Waldorf Astoria Hotel in New York City. Sordoni also purchased other hotels in Pennsylvania and New York, and this group of hotels became known as the "Sterling Hotels System".

After World War II, the anthracite coal industry in Northeastern Pennsylvania began to decline. The Knox mine disaster in 1959 essentially ended coal mining in the area. In time, other forms of manufacturing also departed the area.

In the following decades, the Sterling experienced a gradual decline, along with some changes of ownership.

In the 1960s–70s the hotel became a dormitory space for students from Kings and Wilkes college; both campuses were located nearby. The original 1897 building was converted into apartments, mostly for retirees. The former Plaza tower hosted students and also some permanent residents, many of whom rented rooms that were converted into "efficiency" units. These were two rooms that were combined, with the redundant bathroom converted into a small kitchen. The connector building still served for transient guests.

By the 1980s, the college students had left, and the Sterling could no longer compete for transient guests, if not permanent residents and catering business. There were more modern hotels in the area that attracted that business. A decline in population and economic productivity in the city also contributed to the Sterling's downfall.

== Demolition ==
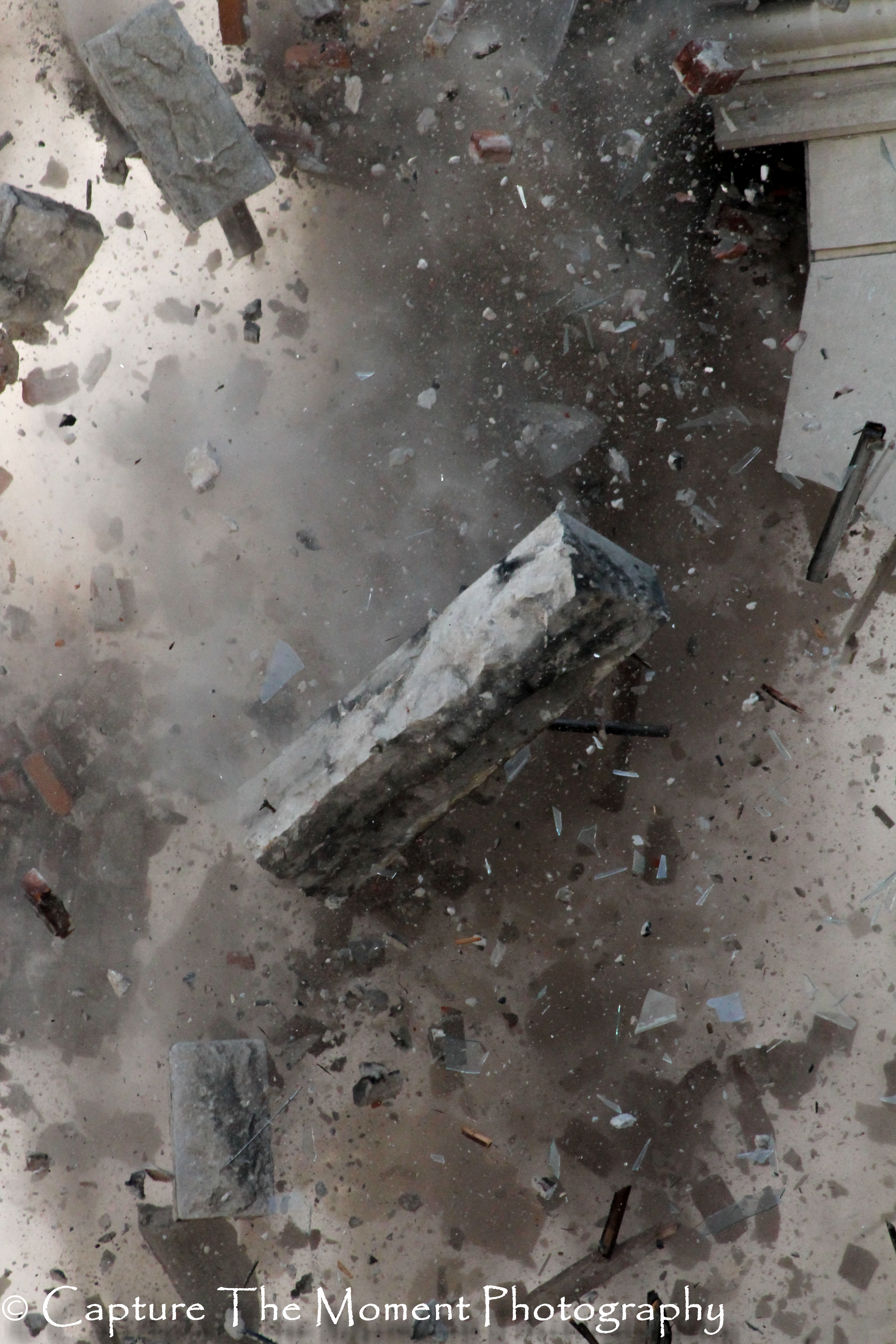
Facade Crumbles

In 1998, the hotel closed after its owner was unable to pay a $227,000 electric bill. The hotel was essentially abandoned after that point, and a small fire broke out two years later. The fire and lack of maintenance quickly took its toll on the buildings, which then suffered from vandalism, leaking roofs, and the freeze-thaw cycle the area experiences.

The hotel was purchased in a tax sale in 2002 by a non-profit organization named CityVest, who had plans to restore the hotel. Part of these plans included acquiring additional land, including an adjacent parking lot, and after advisement from appropriate professionals, demolishing the Plaza Tower and connector building, and leaving just the original 1897 hotel building. This demolition was completed in 2007. The money to accomplish this, over $6 million, came from federal, state and county government. The idea was to make the property attractive to potential developers. However, CityVest failed to mothball the original Hotel Sterling, and as a result the building stood in a state of great decrepitude, with restoration costs estimated at up to $35 million. This is aside from the cost of potentially developing the adjacent properties to make the eventual development viable. Such costs could reach $100 million.

During July 2011, CityVest indicated that they failed to attract an investor-developer to the Sterling site, and now wishes to demolish the remaining original 1897 hotel, and local politicians agreed with this course of action. The cost of demolition was estimated to be between $1 and $2 million.

In September 2011, Luzerne County suffered record flooding due to Tropical Storm Lee. Flood waters from the nearby Susquehanna River flooded the Sterling's basement to a height of several feet. While the water eventually drained, it left several inches of mud in the basement, and a subsequent inspection by local engineers determined that parts the building may be in danger of collapse. This was reported by the Times Leader newspaper. The city of Wilkes-Barre announced plans to divert Market street traffic away from the Sterling as reported by the Times Leader. On November 17, 2011, Wilkes Barre City Council voted unanimously on a $1 million project to demolish the Hotel Sterling in February 2012.

After a 17-month delay from the originally scheduled demolition date, demolition of the building commenced on July 25, 2013, the building was completely demolished by July 30, 2013, and clean-up is expected to be mostly complete by August 6, 2013. Below ground stabilization work will continue until around August 27, 2013. It must be completed no later than September 23, 2013. Brdaric Excavating was awarded the bid on June 18, 2013, for the demolition project after submitting the lowest bid ($419,000) out of 14 considered by the city.

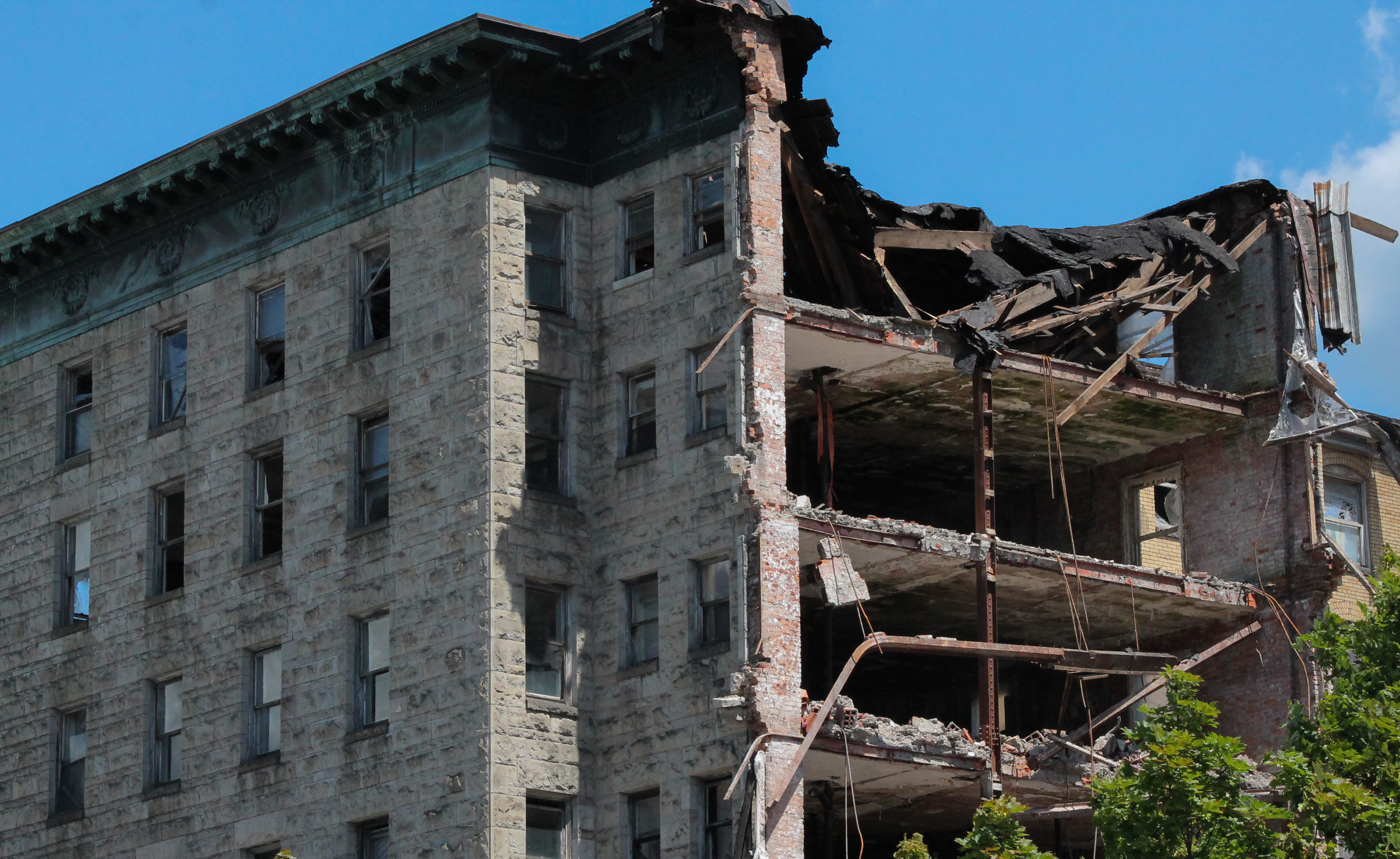

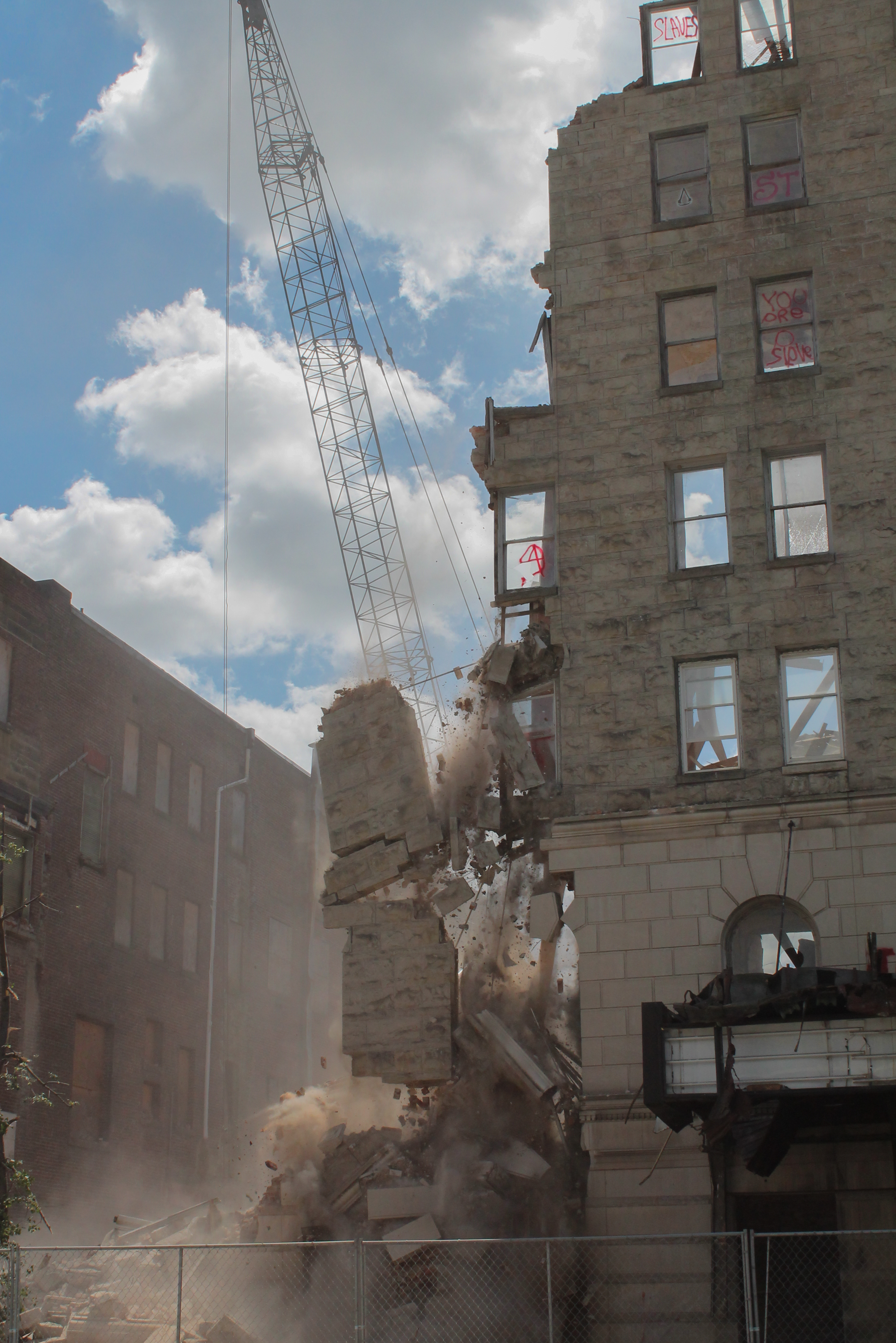
