= Governor Roosevelt =

Governor Roosevelt may refer to:

- Theodore Roosevelt, 33rd Governor of New York from January 1, 1899 to December 31, 1900
- Theodore Roosevelt Jr., Governor General of the Philippines from February 29, 1932 to July 15, 1933
- Franklin D. Roosevelt, 44th Governor of New York from January 1, 1929 to December 31, 1932
