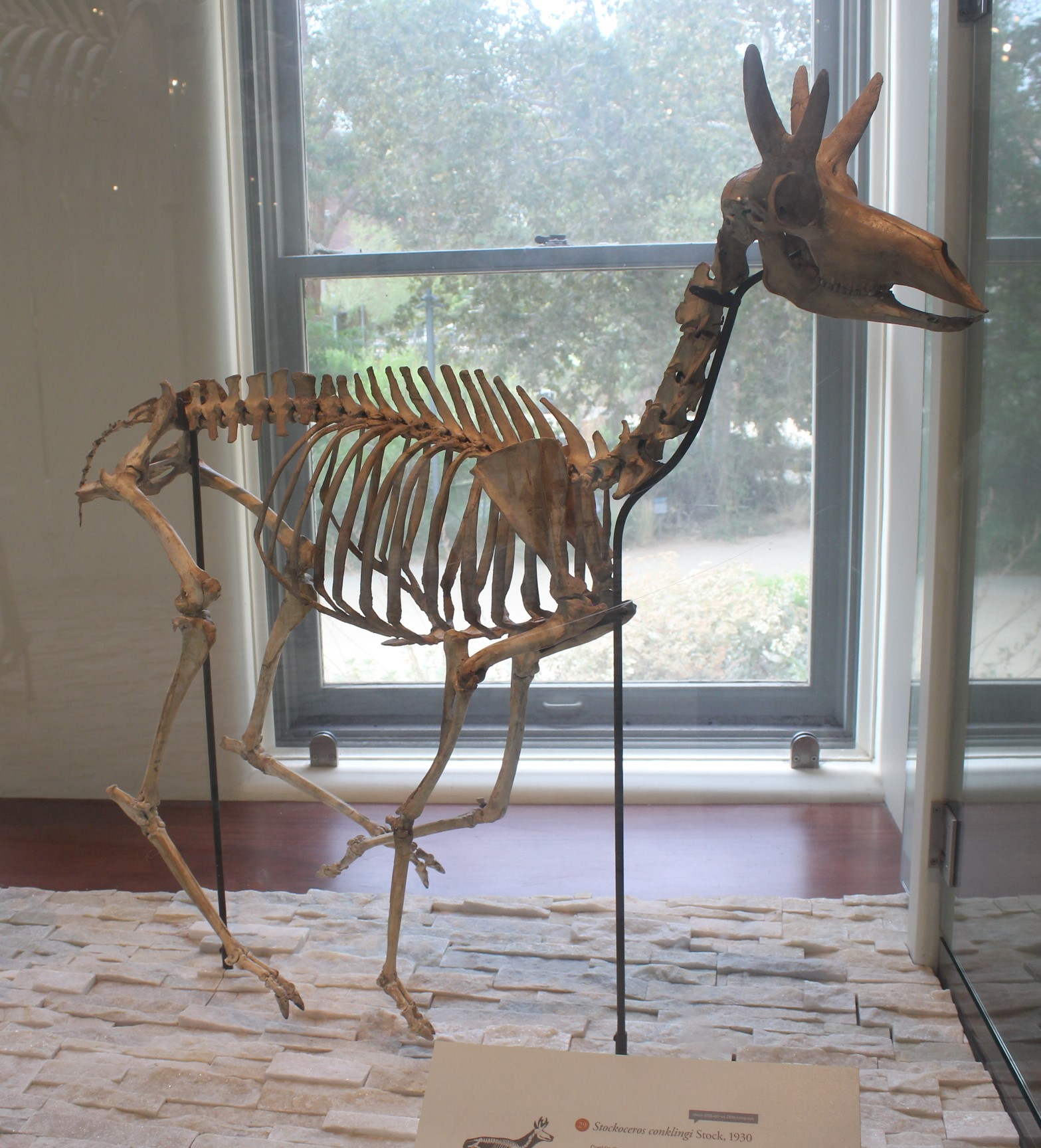
- S. conklingi skeleton
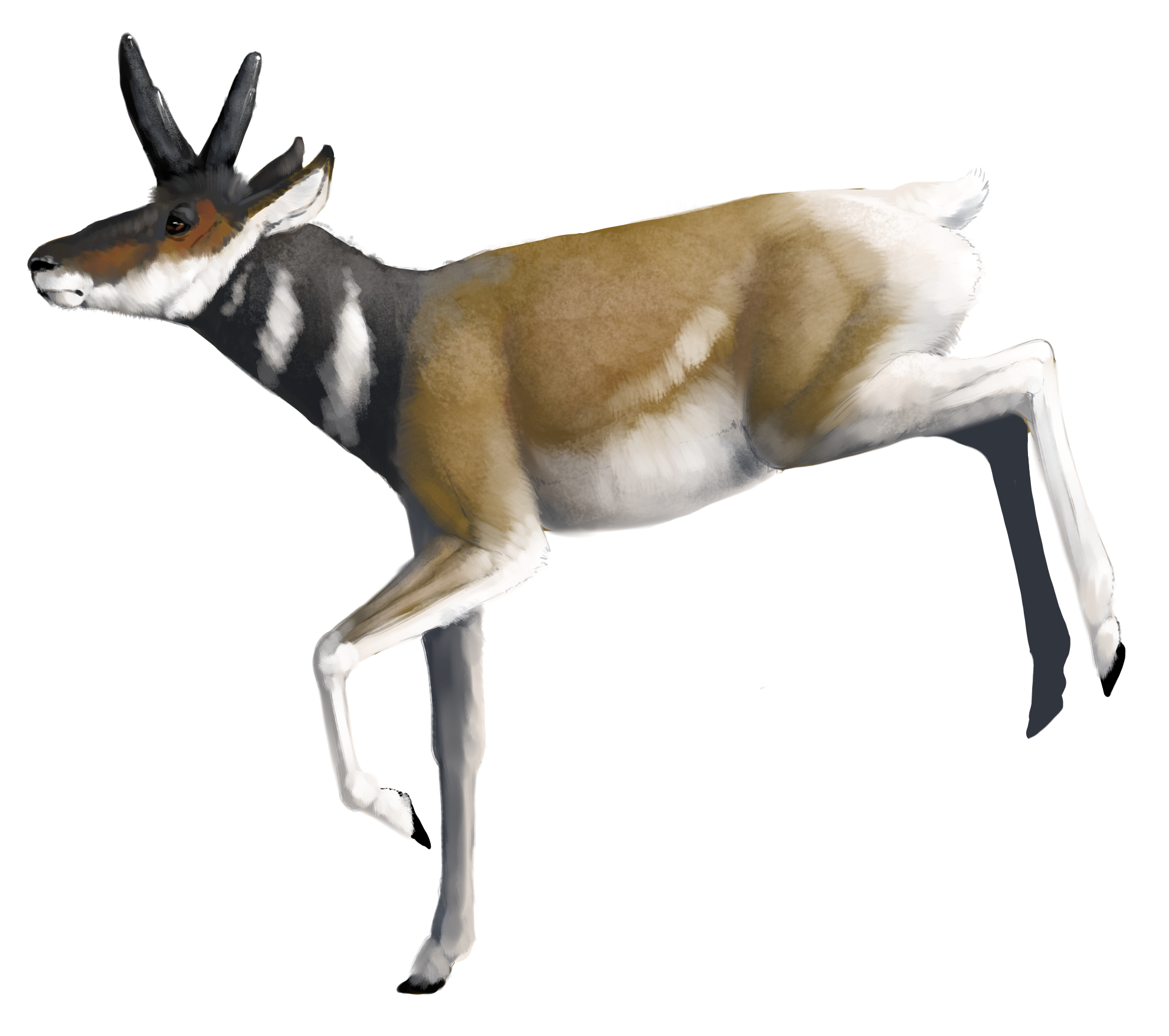
- Life restoration

Scientific classification
- Kingdom: Animalia
- Phylum: Chordata
- Class: Mammalia
- Infraclass: Placentalia
- Order: Artiodactyla
- Family: Antilocapridae
- Tribe: †Stockoceratini
- Genus: †Stockoceros; Skinner, 1942

Species
- S. conklingi Stock, 1930; S. onusrosagris Roosevelt and Burden, 1934

= Stockoceros =

Stockoceros Temporal range: 1.8–0.012 Ma

Extinct genus of mammals

Stockoceros is an extinct genus of the North American artiodactyl family Antilocapridae (pronghorns), one known to have inhabited what is now Mexico and the Southwestern United States during the Pleistocene epoch. The genus survived until about 12,000 years ago, and was present when Paleo-Indians arrived in North America from Eurasia.

== Discovery ==
One of the co-discoverers and co-describers of S. onusrosagris, which has since been synonymised with the other species S. conklingi, was Quentin Roosevelt II, grandson of United States President Theodore Roosevelt; he was 14 at the time of the discovery.

== Description ==
The horns are each divided near their base into two prongs of roughly equal length. The horns were characterised by outward flaring. Its molars possessed sharp apical cusps, although their extreme tips did exhibit a degree of rounding.

== Taxonomy ==
Though long considered separate species, a 2013 study found S. conklingi to be synonymous with S. onusrosagris, with the latter being the junior synonym and thus invalid.

== Palaeoecology ==
A dental mesowear and microwear study suggests that S. conklingi was a mixed feeder that would have engaged in both grazing and browsing behaviour. This pattern of feeding has been suggested to be reflective of seasonal selective feeding on grasses. S. conklingi had a significantly greater intake of grass into its diet as compared to the living pronghorn.

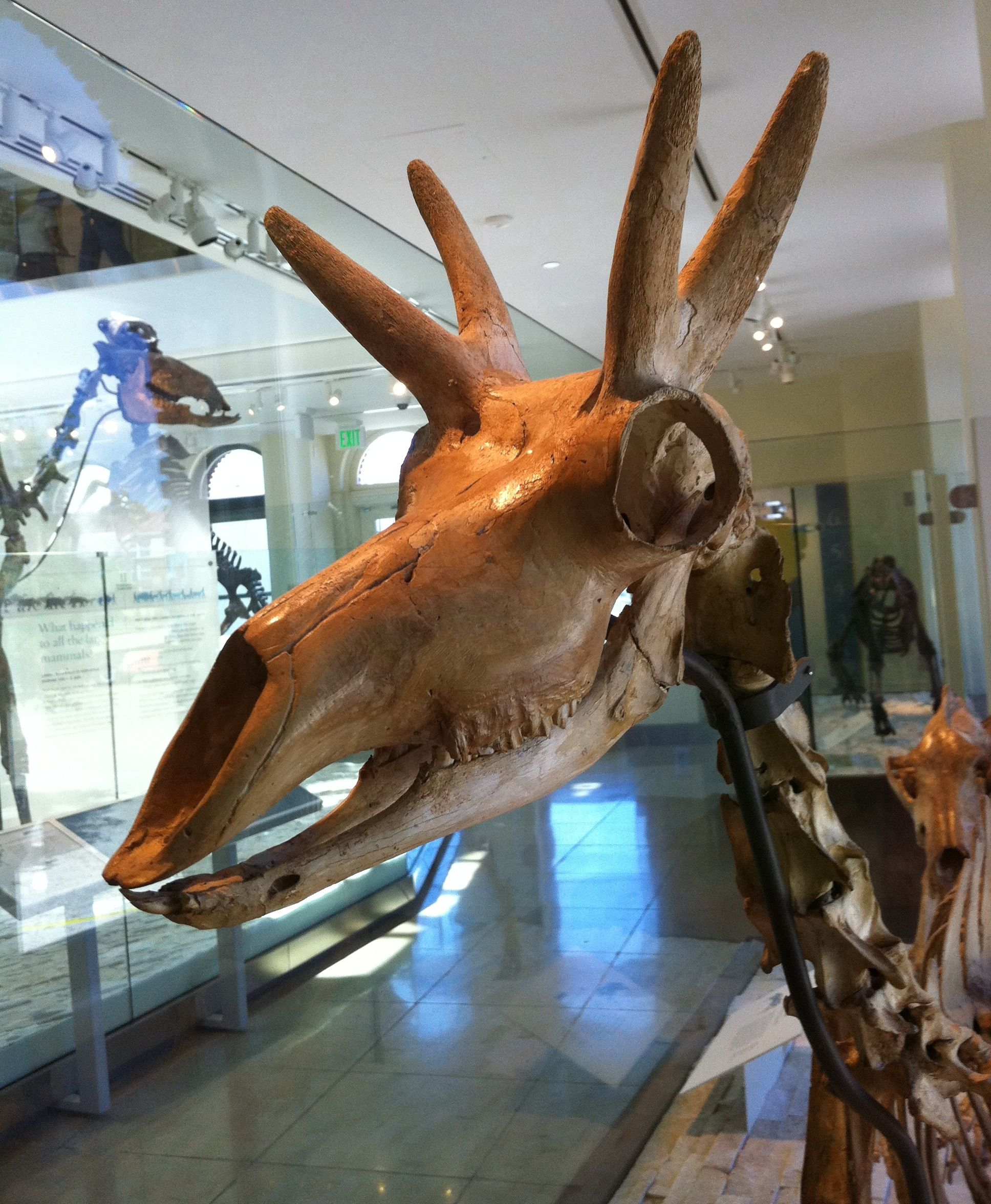
S. conklingi skull
