= Susan Roosevelt Weld =

American educator

First Lady of Massachusetts
- In role January 3, 1991 – July 29, 1997
- Governor: Bill Weld
- Preceded by: Kitty Dukakis
- Succeeded by: Jan Cellucci

Personal details
- Born: Susan Roosevelt
- Spouse: Bill Weld (m. 1975; div. 2002)
- Children: 5
- Parent(s): Quentin Roosevelt II; Frances Blanche Webb
- Relatives: Anna Curtenius Roosevelt (sister); Theodore Roosevelt (great-grandfather); See Roosevelt family
- Education: Harvard University (BA, JD, PhD)
- Occupation: Lawyer, academic, politician

Susan Roosevelt Weld is an American educator who is a former professor at Harvard specializing in ancient Chinese civilization and law. She also was General Counsel to the Congressional-Executive Commission on China. She was the First Lady of Massachusetts from 1991 to 1997.

== Career ==
Weld is currently an adjunct professor and executive director of the Law Asia Leadership program at Georgetown University Law School. She serves on the Advisory Council of the US-China Education Trust.

== Personal life and ancestry ==
She is the daughter of Quentin Roosevelt II and Frances Blanche Webb, granddaughter of Theodore Roosevelt Jr., and great-granddaughter of Theodore Roosevelt. She is the grand-niece of Kermit Roosevelt, Quentin Roosevelt, Archibald Roosevelt, Ethel Roosevelt Derby and Alice Roosevelt Longworth.

She graduated from Radcliffe College of Harvard University in 1970, from Harvard Law School in 1974, and from Harvard University with a PhD, in 1990, in East Asian Languages and Civilizations.

She was married to former Massachusetts governor Bill Weld from July 7, 1975, until she divorced him in 2002. She is the mother of five children by Weld: David Minot, Ethel Derby, Mary Blake, Quentin Roosevelt and Frances Wylie.

She is a second cousin of her former husband's opponent in the 1994 Massachusetts gubernatorial election, Mark Roosevelt, grandson of her grandfather's brother Kermit Roosevelt.

== Selected works ==
- Covenant in Jin's Walled Cities: The Discoveries at Houma and Wenxian, PhD Dissertation, Harvard University, 1990. Available via ProQuest here.

== See also ==
- Weld family

Honorary titles
| Preceded by Kitty Dukakis | First Lady of Massachusetts; 1991–1997 | Succeeded by Jan Cellucci |
