= Cornelius V. S. Roosevelt =

Central Intelligence Agency officer

Personal details
- Born: Cornelius Van Schaack Roosevelt III; October 23, 1915 New York City, U.S.
- Died: August 3, 1991 (aged 75) Washington, D.C., U.S.
- Relations: Roosevelt family
- Parent(s): Theodore Roosevelt Jr. Eleanor Butler Alexander
- Education: Harvard University; Massachusetts Institute of Technology
- Nickname: Corney

Military service
- Allegiance: United States
- Branch/service: United States Navy
- Years of service: 1942–1951
- Rank: Lieutenant commander
- Battles/wars: World War II

Cornelius Van Schaack Roosevelt III (October 23, 1915 – August 3, 1991) was an American intelligence officer, business executive and World War II veteran, who was a grandson of President Theodore Roosevelt. He worked for the CIA from the close of World War II until his retirement in 1973.

== Early life ==
He was the third child of Theodore Roosevelt Jr. and Eleanor Butler Alexander and therefore the grandson of President Theodore Roosevelt. His siblings were Grace, Theodore Roosevelt IV, and Quentin Roosevelt II. He attended Harvard University and graduated in 1938 from the Massachusetts Institute of Technology, where he was a member of St. Anthony Hall.

As an Oyster Bay Roosevelt, and through his ancestor and namesake Cornelius Van Schaack Roosevelt (1794–1871), he was a descendant of the Schuyler family.

== Career ==
From 1938 to 1941, Roosevelt was a mining engineer for the American Smelting and Mining Company in Mexico.

=== World War II ===
He served in the Navy during World War II. He was commissioned as an ensign in the Naval Reserve on May 28, 1942, and promoted to lieutenant (junior grade) on July 1, 1943. He remained in the Naval Reserve after the war and was promoted to lieutenant commander in 1951.

=== Post-War career ===
From 1946 to 1949, he moved to Shanghai where he was the manager of the mining division of William Hunt & Co. In 1949, after the Communist takeover in China, he relocated to Hong Kong where he served as president of the company in 1950. During the same period, he also served as president of International Industries Inc. in Hong Kong.

In 1952, after a brief stint as vice president of Security Banknote Co. in Philadelphia, a research administrator for the Office of Naval Research and president of Linderman Engineering Co., he joined the Central Intelligence Agency in Washington. While in the CIA, he was the chief of the Technical Services Division/TSD from 1959 to 1962.

He served as the chairman of the Technical Surveillance Countermeasures Committee, which involved securing American facilities against electronic eavesdropping. Evan Thomas wrote that Roosevelt was the person who originally suggested the CIA project that attempted to poison Fidel Castro. Roosevelt, as a head of the CIA technical division, supervised Sidney Gottlieb, who brought a biological poison to Congo during the autumn of 1960. To friends and family, he said that his work for the CIA mainly involved creating devices to detect listening devices. He also mentioned that he took part as a subject in the CIA experiments on LSD (part of MKULTRA). Roosevelt retired from the CIA in 1973 and had served in retirement as a defense consultant and on the board of Aerospace Corp.

== Personal life ==
Roosevelt had many lifelong hobbies and interests and published about them: the archaeology of Peru, the history of early sugar processing machines in the Caribbean, Japanese Netsuke carvings, and scuba-diving. He gave a collection of more than 50 M. C. Escher prints to the National Gallery of Art.

Roosevelt was a member of the Metropolitan Club and the Army and Navy Club in Washington.

== See also ==
- Roosevelt family
