= Theodore Roosevelt III =

American governmental official

Theodore Roosevelt IV
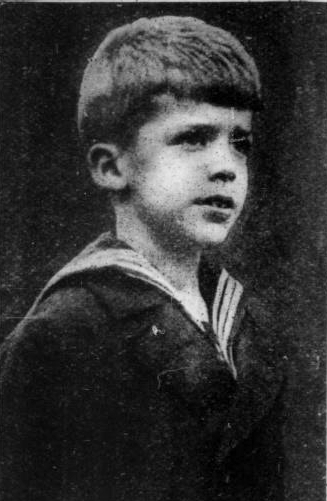
- Roosevelt in 1923

Pennsylvania Secretary of Commerce
- In office May 2, 1949 – January 16, 1951
- Governor: James H. Duff
- Preceded by: Orus J. Matthews
- Succeeded by: Andrew J. Sordoni

Personal details
- Born: June 14, 1914 New York City, New York, U.S.
- Died: May 2, 2001 (aged 86) Bryn Mawr, Pennsylvania, U.S.
- Resting place: Brookside Cemetery; Mount Desert, Maine
- Spouse: Anne Mason Babcock (m. 1940; died 2001)
- Relations: Roosevelt family
- Children: Theodore V
- Parents: Theodore Roosevelt III; Eleanor Butler Alexander
- Education: Groton School
- Alma mater: Harvard University

Military service
- Allegiance: United States
- Branch/service: United States Navy
- Years of service: 1942–1945
- Rank: Lieutenant Commander
- Battles/wars: World War II; Pacific theater
- Awards: Air Medal

Theodore Roosevelt IV (/ˈroʊzəvɛlt/ ROH-zə-velt; June 14, 1914 – May 2, 2001), also known as Theodore III, was an American banker, government official, and veteran of World War II. He was a grandson of President Theodore Roosevelt through his father, Brig. Gen. Theodore Roosevelt III. His name suffix varies since President Roosevelt's father was Theodore Roosevelt Sr., though the same-named son did not commonly use a "Jr." name suffix.

== Early life ==
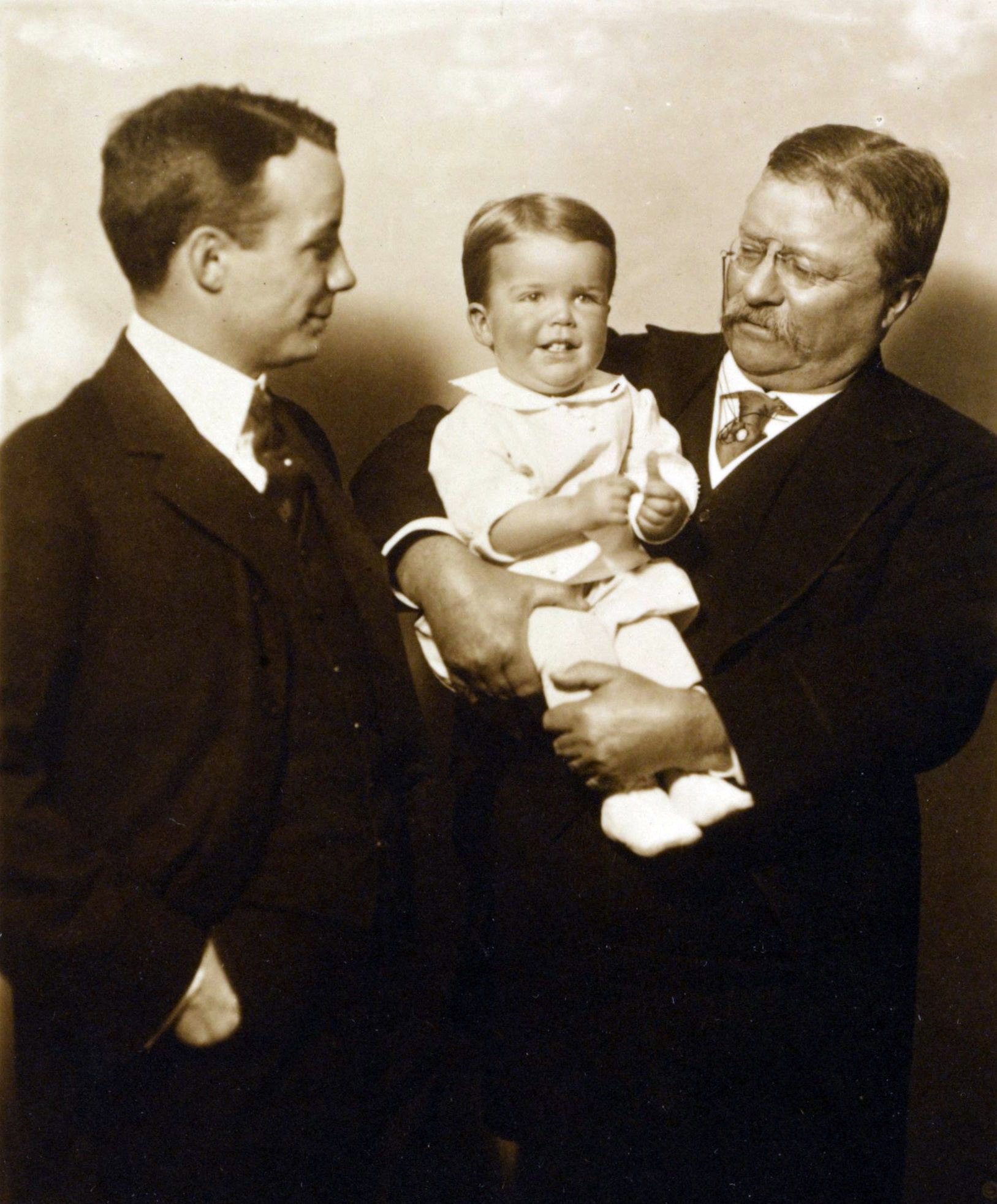
Roosevelt IV (middle) as an infant with his father Theodore "Ted" Roosevelt III (left) and paternal grandfather Theodore Roosevelt Jr. (right)

Roosevelt was born on June 14, 1914, in New York City. He was the second born and the last surviving of four children to Theodore Roosevelt III and Eleanor Butler Alexander. Theodore had an older sister, Grace Green Roosevelt, who married William McMillan, and two younger brothers, Cornelius Van Schaack Roosevelt III and Quentin Roosevelt II. Following his father and paternal grandfather, Roosevelt went to Groton School and graduated from Harvard in 1936, where he was a member of the Hasty Pudding Theatricals and the Owl Club. While at Harvard, Roosevelt played for the Harvard Crimson men's soccer team, and was named a second-team All American in 1934.

As an Oyster Bay Roosevelt, Ted was a descendant of the Schuyler family. His maternal grandparents are Henry Addison Alexander and Grace Green.

== Career ==
After graduating from Harvard, Roosevelt worked for the DuPont company from 1936 to 1941.

=== Service in World War II ===
Following the Roosevelt tradition of military service during times of national emergency, during World War II, Roosevelt volunteered as a Navy pilot, serving as a flag lieutenant (i.e. an aide to an admiral) in the Pacific theater. For his service as a naval aviator, Theodore was awarded the Air Medal. He was promoted to lieutenant on April 1, 1944, and left the Navy as a lieutenant commander.

=== Post-war life ===
Upon his return from the Pacific Theater, Theodore joined the Philadelphia brokerage firm of Montgomery, Scott, becoming a partner in 1952. Appointed by Governor James H. Duff, he served as Secretary of Commerce of Pennsylvania from 1949 to 1951.

For many years, he was president of the Competitive Enterprise System, Inc., a nonprofit organization that promoted free markets in the United States. Roosevelt was a trustee of the Theodore Roosevelt Association (TRA) for many years and a generous supporter of the organization. In recent years, he attended TRA Police Awards ceremonies in Boston and Philadelphia as well as TRA annual meetings in Boston and Norfolk, VA. He was an honorary plank owner in the USS Theodore Roosevelt, and a strong supporter of the efforts to preserve the Pine Knot site in Virginia, his grandparents' presidential retreat.

== Personal life ==
On February 3, 1940, Roosevelt wed Anne Mason Babcock. They had one son, Theodore V (born 1942), and were married until her death on January 29, 2001. Roosevelt died on May 2, 2001, in Bryn Mawr, Pennsylvania. He and his wife are buried at Brookside Cemetery, near Somesville, in the town of Mount Desert, Maine.
