= Eleanor Butler Roosevelt =

American philanthropist (1888–1960)

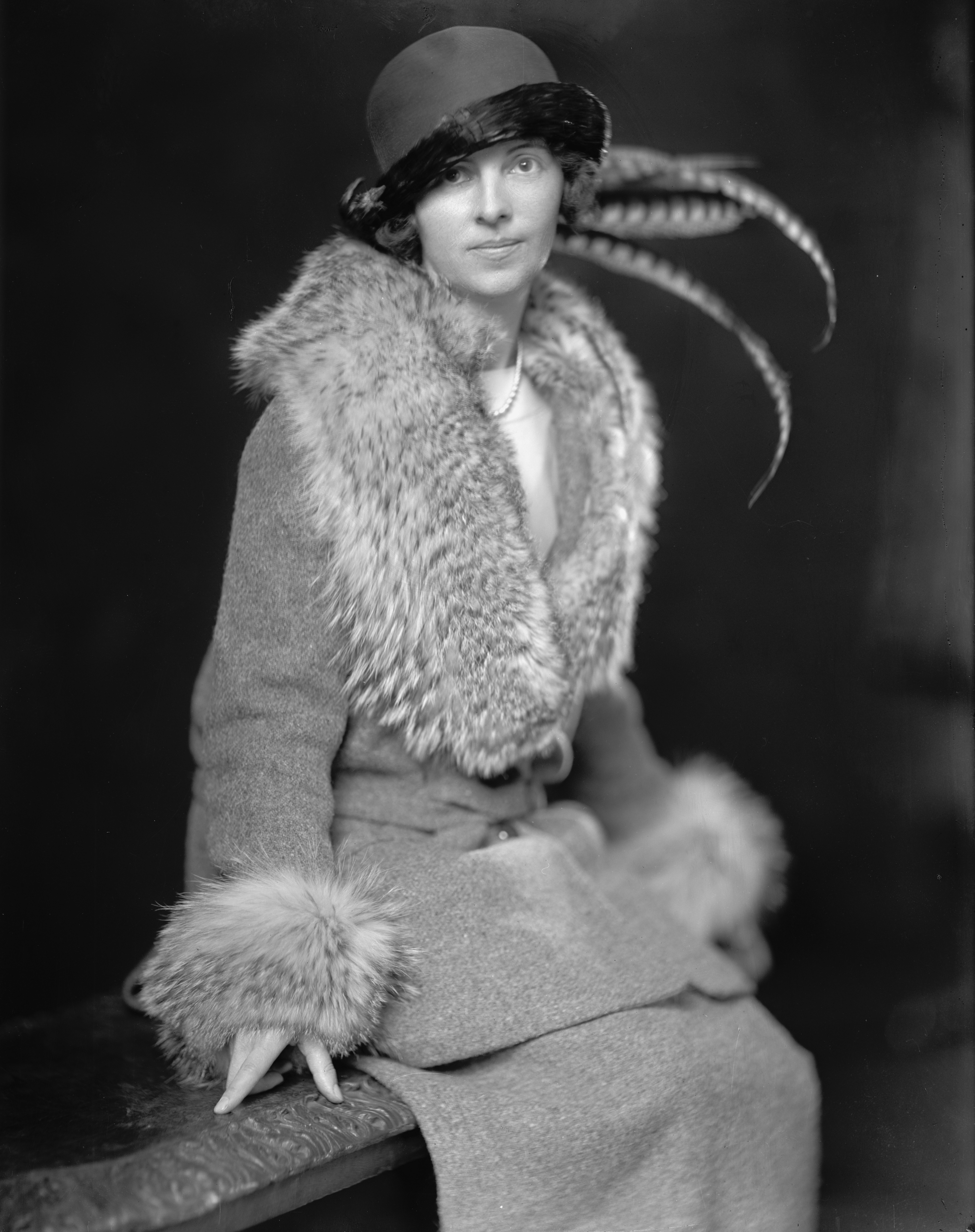
- Born: Eleanor Butler Alexander; December 26, 1888; New York City, U.S.
- Died: May 29, 1960 (aged 71); Oyster Bay, New York, U.S.
- Resting place: Youngs Memorial Cemetery, Oyster Bay, New York, U.S.
- Political party: Republican
- Spouse: Theodore Roosevelt III (m. 1910; died 1944)
- Children: Grace; Theodore; Cornelius; Quentin
- Parents: Henry Addison Alexander (father); Grace Green (mother)

Eleanor Butler Alexander Roosevelt (December 26, 1888 – May 29, 1960) was an American philanthropist. She was the wife of General Theodore Roosevelt III, and a daughter-in-law of Theodore Roosevelt, the 26th President of the United States.

== Early life ==
Eleanor Butler Alexander was born on December 26, 1888, in New York City, the only daughter of Henry Addison Alexander, a prominent New York lawyer, and Grace Green. She was a great-granddaughter of the late Theron Rudd Butler. Her great aunt was Eleanor Butler Sanders.

== Career ==
Throughout her life, Roosevelt not only supported her husband's career but also proved a highly organized, socially conscious person in her own right. From July 1917 to December 1918, she was heavily involved in YMCA canteen work in France and was described by her fellow canteen worker Marian Baldwin as "working like a horse." She helped improve the conditions of Puerto Rican women while her husband was governor of the island (1929–31); she organized the first American women's committee for China Relief (1937); and she directed the American Red Cross Club in England (1942). Roosevelt received citations and commendations from, among others, the French government, Gen. John J. Pershing, and the U.S. War Department. She also wrote an account of her life in her memoirs, Day Before Yesterday.

=== Photography ===
Roosevelt was also a keen photographer. In 1986, her daughter Grace presented 25 of her albums to the Library of Congress together with some 5,000 of her own photographs, including images of presidents and international dignitaries. In later life, Roosevelt and Grace studied with photographer J. Ghislain Lootens. She used a Voigtländer Superb from 1935, developing her own film and making her own prints. Her travel photographs of Europe, Mexico and Asia are of a particularly high quality.

== Personal life ==
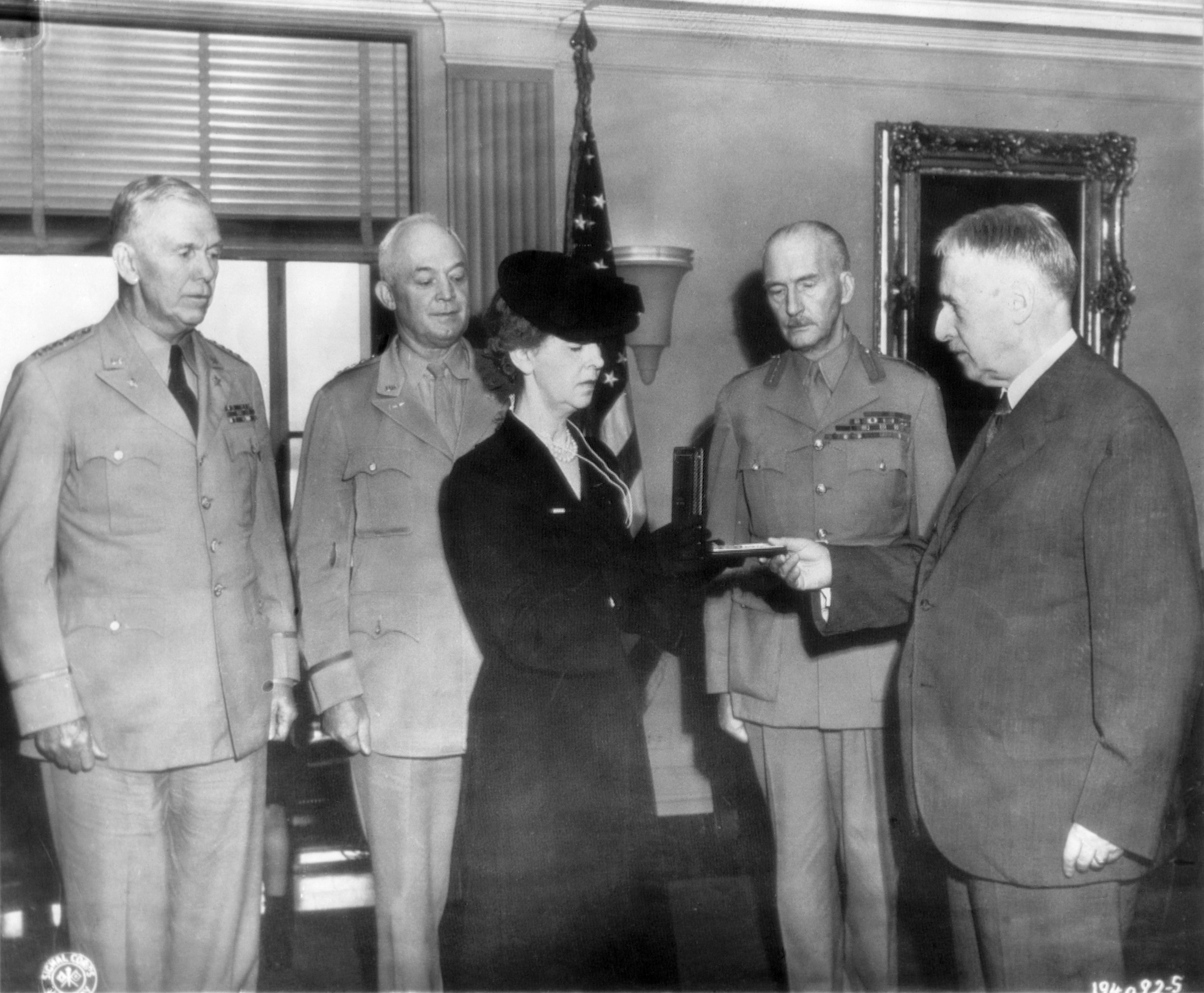
Eleanor Butler Roosevelt receives the Medal of Honor posthumously presented to her husband (September 21, 1944). From left: Gen. George Marshall, U.S. Army Chief of Staff; Gen. Henry H. Arnold, commanding U.S. Army Air Forces; Mrs. Roosevelt; British Field Marshal Sir John Dill; and Secretary of War Henry L. Stimson.

On June 29, 1910, she married Theodore "Ted" Roosevelt III, the eldest son of President Theodore "T.R." Roosevelt Jr. and Edith Kermit Carow, in New York City at the Fifth Avenue Presbyterian Church on 55th Street and Fifth Avenue (Manhattan). Ted was the only general officer to land in the first wave on D-Day and was awarded the Medal of Honor. Ted and Eleanor had four children:

- Grace Green Roosevelt McMillan (1911–1994)
- Theodore Roosevelt IV (1914–2001)
- Cornelius Van Schaack Roosevelt III (1915–1991)
- Quentin Roosevelt II (1919–1948)

She died on May 29, 1960, at Oyster Bay, Nassau Co., Long Island, NY, sixteen years after her husband, who had died of a heart attack shortly after the Invasion of Normandy (1944).

== See also ==
- Soldiers', Sailors', Marines', Coast Guard and Airmen's Club
