= Andrew J. Sordoni =

American politician (1887–1963)

Pennsylvania Secretary of Commerce
- In office March 7, 1951 – November 19, 1954
- Governor: John S. Fine
- Preceded by: Theodore Roosevelt III
- Succeeded by: William W. Behrens

Member of the Pennsylvania State Senate from the 20th district
- In office December 1, 1926 – December 1, 1938
- Preceded by: Asa K. DeWitt
- Succeeded by: Robert M. Miller

Personal details
- Born: Andrew John Sordoni; February 11, 1887 Nanticoke, Pennsylvania, U.S.
- Died: February 27, 1963 (aged 76) Miami Beach, Florida, U.S.
- Political party: Republican
- Spouse: Ruth Speece (m. 1910)

Andrew John Sordoni Sr. (February 11, 1887 – February 27, 1963) was an American businessman and politician. A member of the Republican Party, he was elected to three terms in the Pennsylvania State Senate. In 1951, a decade after his legislative service, he was appointed by Governor John S. Fine to be the state's secretary of commerce. Sordoni's tenure as secretary was controversial, with critics highlighting his alleged conflicts of interest and "absenteeism" in the role.
