= Quentin Roosevelt II =

Member of the Roosevelt family (1919–1948)

- Born: November 4, 1919; Oyster Bay, New York, US
- Died: December 21, 1948 (aged 29); Basalt Island, Hong Kong
- Spouse: Frances Blanche Webb (m. 1944)
- Children: Alexandra; Susan; Anna
- Military career
- Allegiance: United States
- Branch: United States Army
- Service years: 1941–1945
- Rank: Major
- Service number: 0-417669
- Unit: 1st Infantry Division
- Conflicts: World War II; Battle of Kasserine Pass; Battle of Normandy
- Awards: Silver Star; Purple Heart; French Croix de Guerre
- Other work: Director of the China National Aviation Corporation

Quentin Roosevelt II (November 4, 1919 – December 21, 1948) was the fourth child and youngest son of Theodore "Ted" Roosevelt III and Eleanor Butler Alexander. His uncle and namesake Quentin Roosevelt I was killed in action in 1918 during World War I. His elder brothers were World War II veterans Theodore Roosevelt IV and Cornelius Van Schaack Roosevelt III. He was a grandson of President Theodore Roosevelt.

== Life ==
Quentin Roosevelt II was born on November 4, 1919, in Oyster Bay, New York, less than one year after the death of his grandfather, Theodore Roosevelt, the 26th president of the United States.

Roosevelt published a paper through the American Museum of Natural History in 1934, describing a new species of fossil pronghorn that he and a boyhood friend, Joseph W. Burden, had found in a cave in southern Arizona. He attended Harvard College, where he wrote his senior thesis on some Nakhi (Naxi) manuscripts he had collected while visiting Western China at the border of Tibet. Life magazine published images from his journey, which he made at the age of 19.

== Military career ==
He graduated from Groton School followed by Harvard College in 1941 and soon after joined the Army.

=== World War II ===
Roosevelt served in the 1st Infantry Division, alongside his father. He served as an artillery officer in the unit.

In 1942, he was seriously wounded by machine gun fire from a German aircraft but survived, and returned to service within a year.

During the war, he fought in the Battle of Kasserine Pass (February 1943). Roosevelt was among the first wave of soldiers to land at Omaha Beach while his father landed with the first wave at Utah Beach on D-Day.

Roosevelt earned the Silver Star, Purple Heart, and French Croix de Guerre for his war service. He was promoted to major by the end of war and left active service.

== Death ==
While serving as the Director of the China National Aviation Corporation, he was killed in a plane crash in Hong Kong, on December 21, 1948. He was 29. His C-54 plane crashed on a mountain on Basalt Island, near Sai Kung. All 35 on board were killed instantly. There is no clear record of recovery or disposition of his remains, but they are believed to have been left on Basalt Island.

== Family ==
On April 12, 1944, he married Frances Blanche Webb, an American Red Cross worker, at Blandford Forum. They had three daughters: Alexandra, Susan Roosevelt Weld, and Anna C. Roosevelt, a noted archaeologist specializing in Amazonia, who won a MacArthur Fellowship. Alexandra married Ronald W. Dworkin. Susan graduated from Harvard University with a JD and PhD, and was married to former Massachusetts Governor William Weld; they had five children: David Minot Weld, Ethel Derby Weld, Mary B. Weld, Quentin Roosevelt III (Weld), and Frances Wylie Weld.

== Military awards ==
Roosevelt's decorations and awards include:

Combat Infantryman Badge
Silver Star
Purple Heart	American Defense Service Medal	American Campaign Medal
European–African–Middle Eastern Campaign Medal w/ Arrowhead device and two 3/16" bronze stars	World War II Victory Medal	French Croix de Guerre

== Works ==
- "Buddhism", Life, Jan 8, 1940
