= Pichon =

- Pronunciation: pronounced [ˈpiʃɔ̃]

Origin
- Origin: Breton
- Region of origin: Brittany

Pichon or Le Pichon is a surname, and may refer to:

- Alain le Pichon (born 1944), French anthropologist
- Édouard Pichon (1890–1940), French grammarian and psychoanalyst
- Enrique Pichon-Rivière (1907–1977), Argentine psychiatrist
- Fats Pichon (1906–1967), American jazz musician
- Jean-Louis Pichon (1948–2025), French stage director
- Laurent Pichon (born 1986), French racing cyclist
- Liz Pichon (born 1963), British illustrator and children's writer
- Louis Andre Pichon (1771–1854), French diplomat
- Marcel Pichon (1921–1954), French botanist
- Marinette Pichon (born 1975), French football player
- Mickaël Pichon (born 1976), French motocross racer
- Raphaël Pichon (born 1984), French countertenor, choral and orchestral conductor
- Stephen Pichon (1857–1933), French journalist, diplomat and politician of the Third Republic
- Xavier Le Pichon (1937–2025), French geophysicist
- Pichon, fictional author of the fictional anatomy textbook La Beauté Humaine in Vladimir Nabokov's novel Lolita.

Other:

- Pichon Longueville, archaic Bordeaux wine estate, presently:
  - Château Pichon Longueville Baron, or Pichon Baron
  - Château Pichon Longueville Comtesse de Lalande, or Pichon Comtesse, or Pichon Lalande
