= Theodore Roosevelt Jr. =

American general and politician (1887–1944)

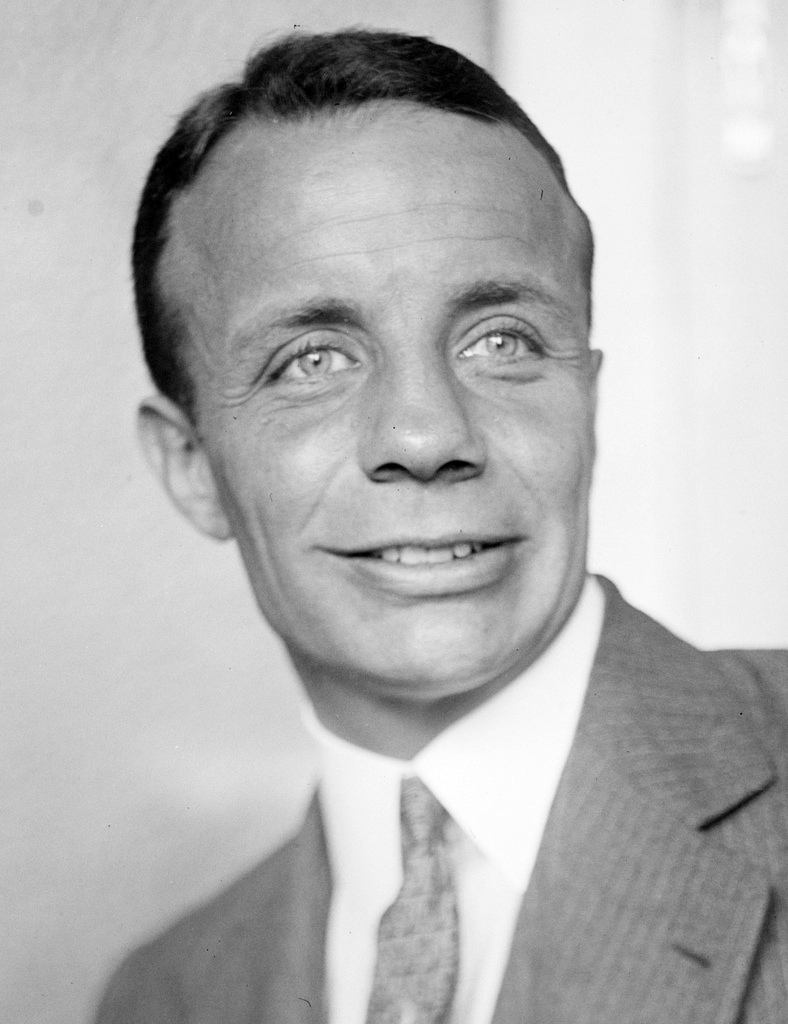
- Roosevelt, c. 1921

Governor-General of the Philippines
- In office February 29, 1932 – July 15, 1933
- President: Herbert Hoover; Franklin D. Roosevelt
- Preceded by: George C. Butte (acting)
- Succeeded by: Frank Murphy

Governor of Puerto Rico
- In office September 9, 1929 – January 30, 1932
- President: Herbert Hoover
- Preceded by: James R. Beverley (acting)
- Succeeded by: James R. Beverley

14th Assistant Secretary of the Navy
- In office March 10, 1921 – September 30, 1924
- President: Warren G. Harding; Calvin Coolidge
- Preceded by: Gordon Woodbury
- Succeeded by: Theodore Douglas Robinson

Member of the New York State Assembly from the 2nd district
- In office 1920–1921
- Preceded by: Franklin A. Coles
- Succeeded by: Frederick Trubee Davison

Personal details
- Born: Theodore Roosevelt III; September 13, 1887 Oyster Bay, New York, U.S.
- Died: July 12, 1944 (aged 56) Méautis, France
- Resting place: Normandy American Cemetery; 49°20′55″N 0°51′17″W
- Party: Republican
- Spouse: Eleanor Butler Alexander (m. 1910)
- Children: Grace; Theodore IV; Cornelius; Quentin
- Parents: Theodore Roosevelt; Edith Carow Roosevelt
- Education: Harvard University (BA)

Military service
- Allegiance: United States
- Branch: United States Army
- Years of service: 1917–1919 (National Army); 1920–1939 (Organized Reserve); 1940–1944 (Army of the United States)
- Rank: Brigadier General
- Unit: 1st Infantry Division; 4th Infantry Division
- Commands: 1st Battalion, 26th Infantry; 26th Infantry
- Campaigns: See battles: World War I; Cantigny (WIA); Soissons; St. Mihiel; Meuse-Argonne; Defensive Sector; World War II; Algeria‑French Morocco; Tunisia; Sicily; Normandy
- Awards: Medal of Honor; Distinguished Service Cross; Distinguished Service Medal; Silver Star (4); Legion of Merit; Purple Heart; Legion of Honor; Croix de Guerre

Theodore Roosevelt III (/ˈroʊzəvɛlt/ ROH-zə-velt; September 13, 1887 – July 12, 1944), often known as Theodore Jr., (Note: While it was President Theodore Roosevelt who was legally named Theodore Roosevelt Jr., the President's fame made it simpler to call his son "Junior".) was an American brigadier general and politician. He was the eldest son of President Theodore Roosevelt and First Lady Edith Roosevelt. Roosevelt is known for his World War II service, including the directing of troops at Utah Beach during the Normandy landings, for which he received the Medal of Honor.

Roosevelt was educated at private academies and Harvard University; after his 1909 graduation from college, he began a successful career in business and investment banking. Having gained pre–World War I army experience during his attendance at a Citizens' Military Training Camp, at the start of the war he received a reserve commission as a major. He served primarily with the 1st Division, took part in several engagements including the Battle of Cantigny, and commanded the 1st Battalion, 26th Infantry as a lieutenant colonel. After the war, Roosevelt was instrumental in the forming of The American Legion.

In addition to his military and business careers, Roosevelt was active in politics and government. He served as Assistant Secretary of the Navy (1921–1924), Governor of Puerto Rico (1929–1932), and Governor-General of the Philippines (1932–1933). He resumed his business endeavors in the 1930s, and was Chairman of the Board of American Express Company, and vice-president of Doubleday Books. Roosevelt also remained active as an Army reservist, attending annual training periods at Pine Camp, and completing the Infantry Officer Basic and Advanced Courses, the Command and General Staff College, and refresher training for senior officers. He returned to active duty for World War II with the rank of colonel, and commanded the 26th Infantry. He soon received promotion to brigadier general as assistant division commander of the 1st Infantry Division.

After serving in the Operation Torch landings in North Africa and the Tunisia Campaign, followed by participation in the Allied invasion of Sicily, Roosevelt was assigned as assistant division commander of the 4th Infantry Division. In this role, he led the first wave of troops ashore at Utah Beach during the Normandy landings in June 1944. He died in France of a heart attack the following month at 56 years old. At the time of his death, he had been recommended for the Distinguished Service Cross to recognize his heroism at Normandy. The recommendation was subsequently upgraded, and Roosevelt was a posthumous recipient of the Medal of Honor.

== Childhood ==
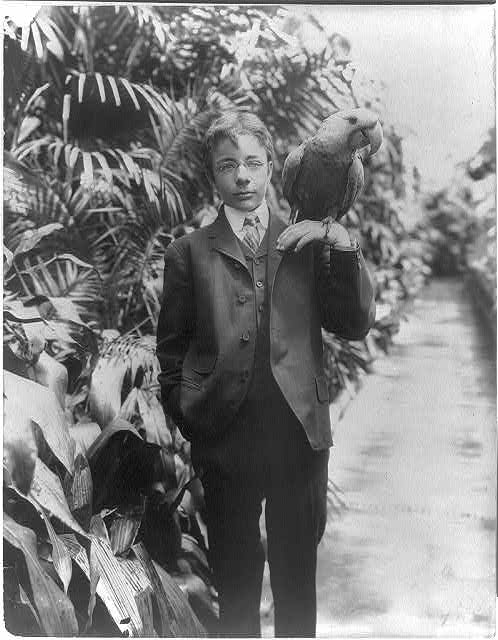
Roosevelt with "Eli Yale" c. June 17, 1902

Roosevelt was the eldest son of President Theodore Roosevelt and First Lady Edith Kermit Carow. He was born at the family estate in Cove Neck on September 13, 1887, Oyster Bay, New York, when his father was resuming his political career after a three-year hiatus. As a son of President Theodore Roosevelt, he has been referred to as "Jr.", but he was actually Theodore III and one of his own sons was Theodore IV. His siblings were brothers Kermit, Archie, and Quentin; sister Ethel; and half-sister Alice. As an Oyster Bay Roosevelt, and through his ancestor Cornelius Van Schaack Jr., Ted was a descendant of the Schuyler family.

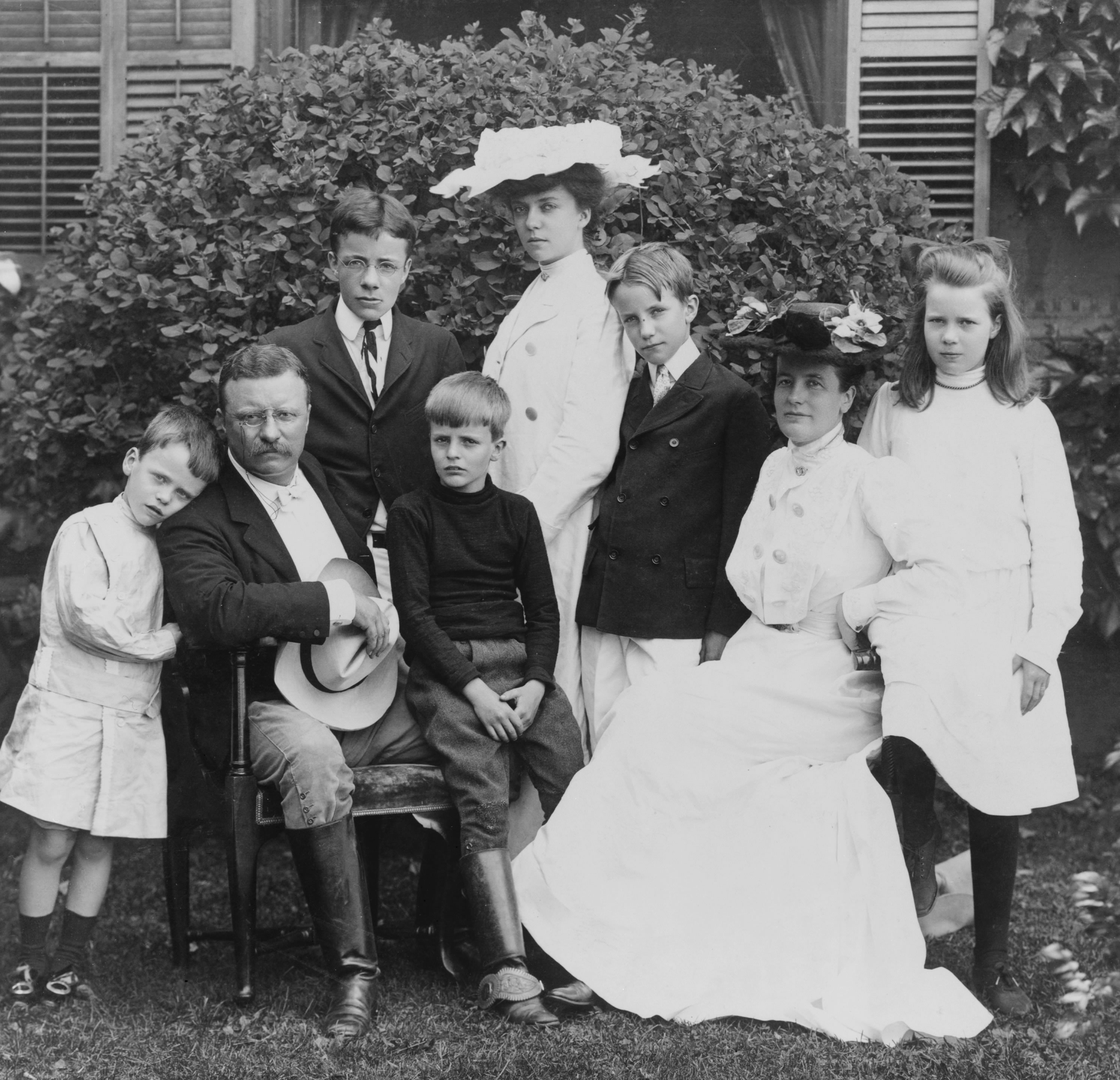
The Roosevelt family in 1903, with Ted third to the right

Like all the Roosevelt children, Ted was tremendously influenced by his father. In later life, Ted recorded some of these childhood recollections in a series of newspaper articles written around the time of World War I. One day when he was about nine, his father gave him a rifle. When Ted asked if it were real, his father loaded it and shot a bullet into the ceiling.

When Ted was a child, his father initially expected more of him than of his siblings. The burden almost caused him to suffer a nervous breakdown.

In one article, Ted recalled his first time in Washington, "...when father was civil service commissioner I often walked to the office with him. On the way down he would talk history to me—not the dry history of dates and charters, but the history where you yourself in your imagination could assume the role of the principal actors, as every well-constructed boy wishes to do when interested. During every battle we would stop and father would draw out the full plan in the dust in the gutter with the tip of his umbrella. Long before the European war had broken over the world father would discuss with us military training and the necessity for every man being able to take his part."

== Education and early business career ==
The Roosevelt boys attended private schools; Ted went to The Albany Academy, and then Groton School. Before he went to college, he thought about going to military school. Although not naturally called to academics, he persisted and graduated from Harvard College in 1909, where, like his father, he joined the Porcellian Club.

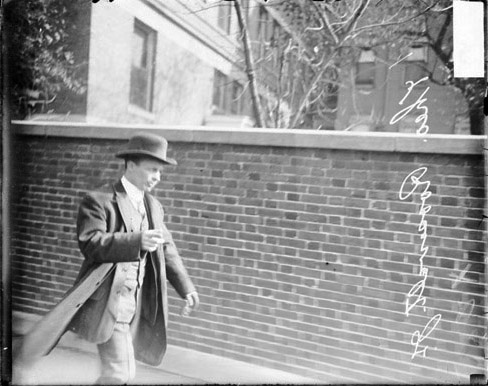
Ted at Mercy Hospital after his father's October 14, 1912 shooting (October 17, 1912)

After graduating from college, Ted entered the business world. He took positions in the steel and carpet businesses before becoming branch manager of an investment bank. He had a flair for business and amassed a considerable fortune in the years leading up to World War I and on into the 1920s. The income generated by his investments positioned him well for a career in politics after the War.

== World War I ==
All the Roosevelt sons, except Kermit, had some military training prior to World War I. With the outbreak of World War I in Europe in August 1914, American leaders had heightened concern about their nation's readiness for military engagement. Only the month before, Congress had authorized the creation of an Aviation Section in the Signal Corps. In 1915, Major General Leonard Wood, President Roosevelt's former commanding officer during the Spanish–American War, organized a summer camp at Plattsburgh, New York, to provide military training for business and professional men, at their own expense.

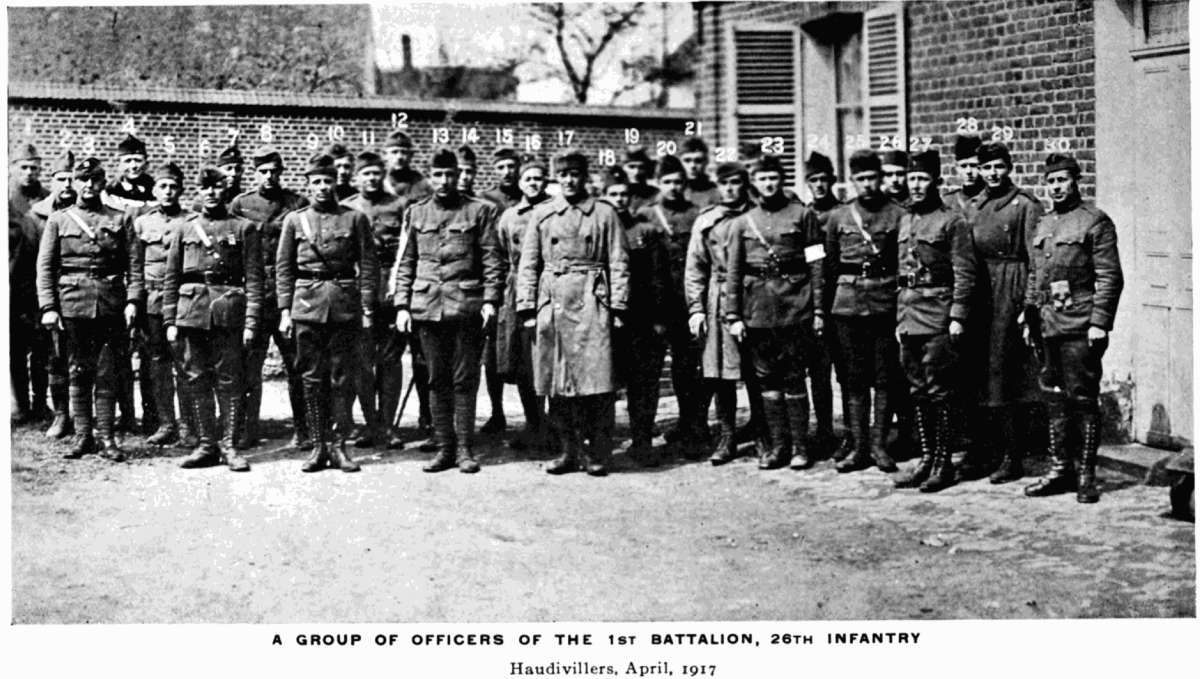
A group of officers of the 1st Battalion, 26th Infantry Regiment, at Haudivillers, Picardy, France, 1917. Major Theodore Roosevelt Jr. is standing ninth from the left.

This summer training program provided the base of a greatly expanded junior officers' corps when the United States entered World War I. During that summer, many well-heeled young men from some of the finest east coast schools, including three of the four Roosevelt sons, attended the military camp. When the United States entered the war, in April 1917, the armed forces offered commissions to the graduates of these schools based on their performance. The National Defense Act of 1916 continued the student military training and the businessmen's summer camps. It placed them on a firmer legal basis by authorizing an Officers' Reserve Corps and a Reserve Officers' Training Corps (ROTC).

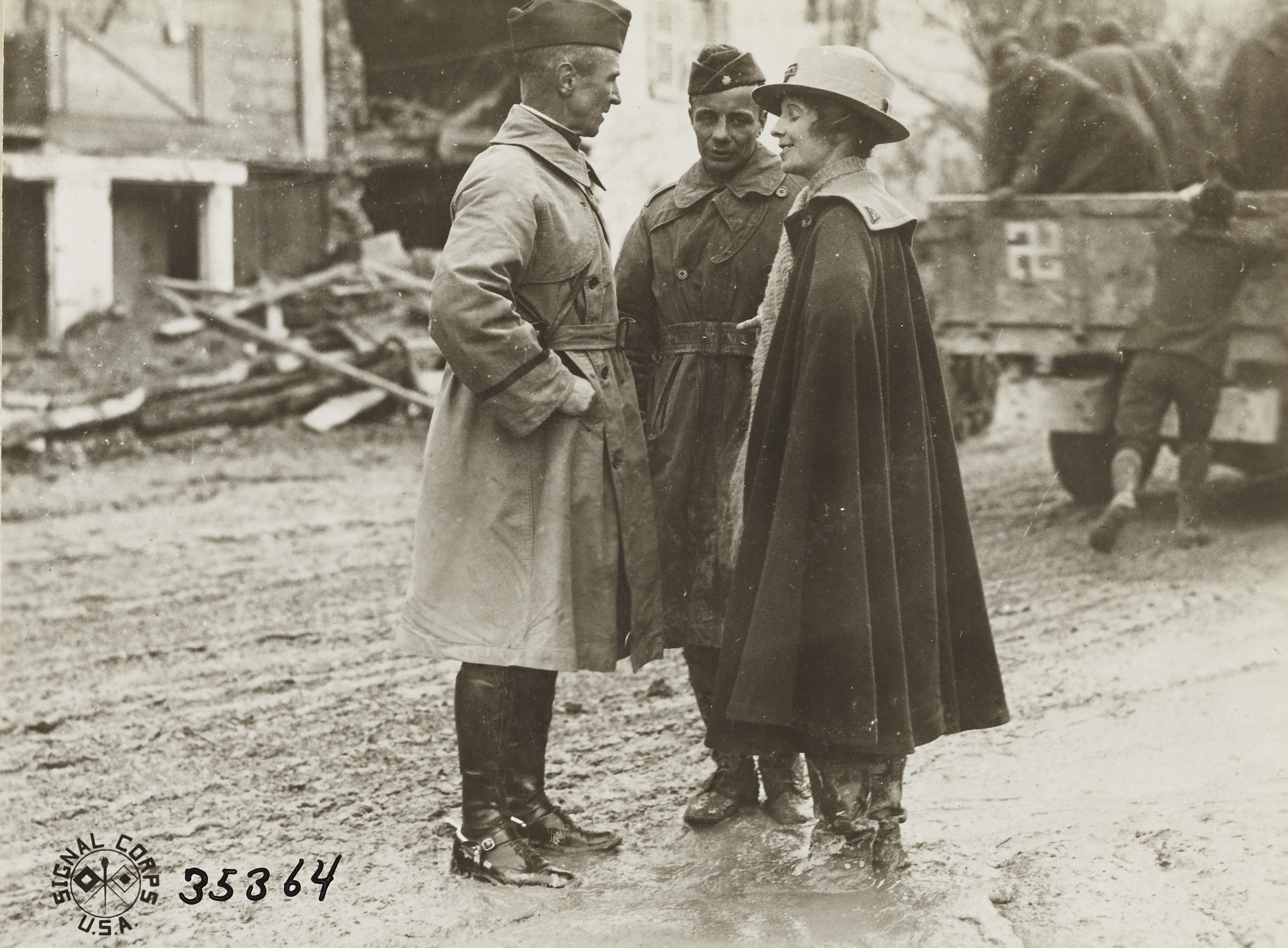
Brigadier General Frank Parker engaged in conversation with Lieutenant Colonel Roosevelt and his wife, pictured here at Romagne, Meuse, France, November 13, 1918.

After the United States declaration of war on Germany, when the American Expeditionary Forces (AEF) was organizing, Theodore Roosevelt wired Major General John "Black Jack" Pershing, the newly appointed commander of the AEF, asking if his sons could accompany him to Europe as privates. Pershing accepted, but, based on their training at Plattsburgh, Archie was offered a commission with rank of second lieutenant, while Ted was offered a commission and the rank of major. Quentin had already been accepted into the Army Air Service. Kermit volunteered with the British in the area of present-day Iraq.

With a reserve commission in the army (like Quentin and Archibald), soon after World War I started, Ted was called up. When the United States declared war on the German Empire, Ted volunteered to be one of the first soldiers to go to the Western Front. There, he was recognized as the best battalion commander in his division, according to the division commander. Roosevelt braved hostile fire and gas and led his battalion in combat. So concerned was he for his men's welfare that he purchased combat boots for the entire battalion with his own money. He eventually commanded the 26th Regiment in the 1st Division as a lieutenant colonel. He fought in several major battles, including America's first victory at the Battle of Cantigny.

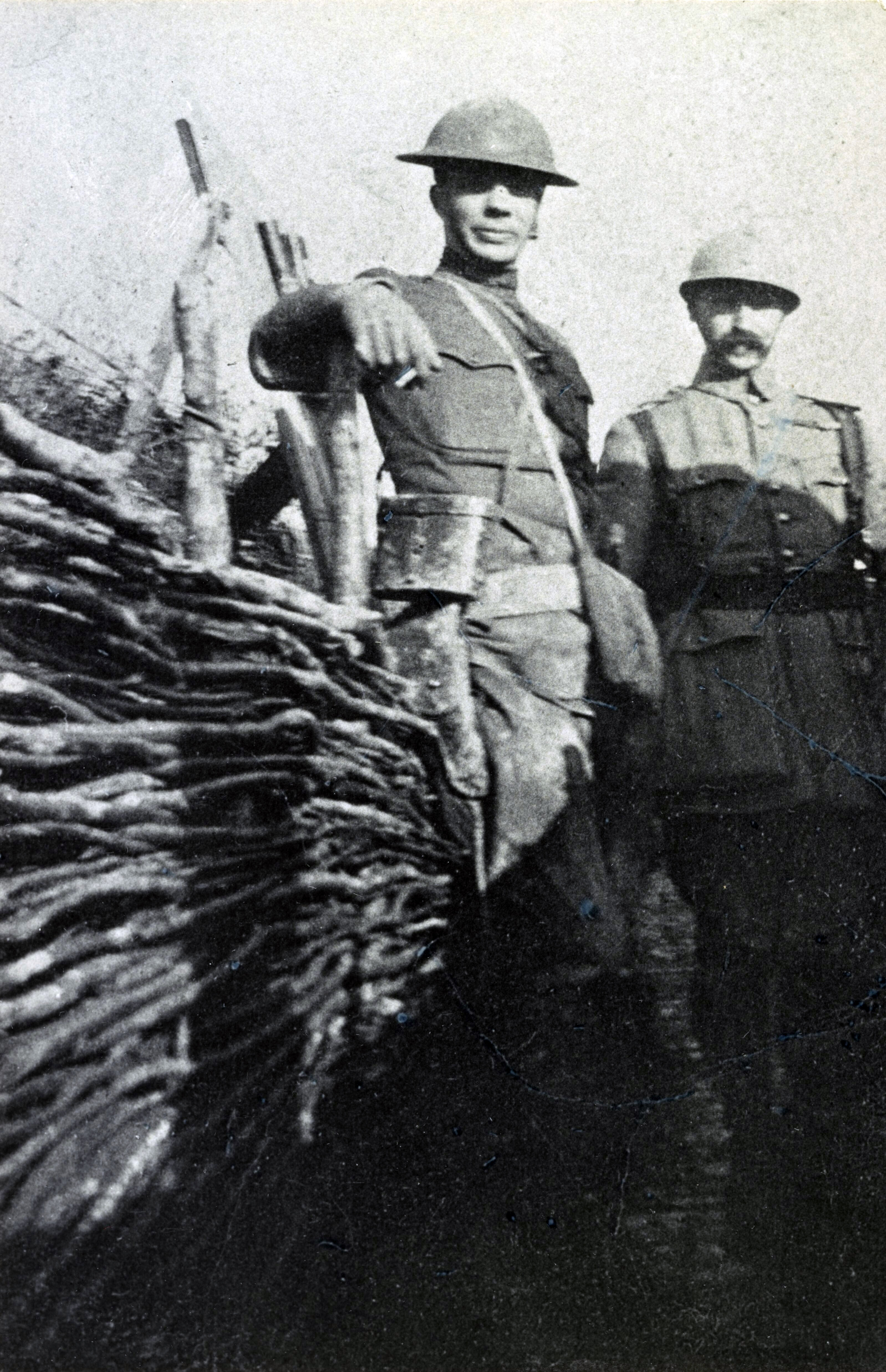
Roosevelt in training with Chasseurs Alpins, 1917

Ted was gassed and wounded at Soissons during the summer of 1918. In July of that year, his youngest brother Quentin was killed in combat. Ted received the Distinguished Service Cross for his actions during the war, which ended on November 11, 1918 at 11:00 am. France conferred upon him the Chevalier Légion d'honneur on March 16, 1919. Before the troops came home from France, Ted was one of the founders of the soldiers' organization that developed as The American Legion. The American Legion Post Officers Guide recounts Ted's part in the organization's founding:

A group of twenty officers who served in the American Expeditionary Forces (A.E.F.) in France in World War I is credited with planning the Legion. A.E.F. Headquarters asked these officers to suggest ideas on how to improve troop morale. One officer, Lieutenant Colonel Theodore Roosevelt, Jr., proposed an organization of veterans. In February 1919, this group formed a temporary committee and selected several hundred officers who had the confidence and respect of the whole army. When the first organization meeting took place in Paris in March 1919, about 1,000 officers and enlisted men attended. The meeting, known as the Paris Caucus, adopted a temporary constitution and the name The American Legion. It also elected an executive committee to complete the organization's work. It considered each soldier of the A.E.F. a member of the Legion. The executive committee named a subcommittee to organize veterans at home in the U.S. The Legion held a second organizing caucus in St. Louis, Missouri, in May 1919. It completed the constitution and made plans for a permanent organization. It set up temporary headquarters in New York City, and began its relief, employment, and Americanism programs. Congress granted the Legion a national charter in September 1919.

When the American Legion met in New York City, Roosevelt was nominated as its first national commander, but he declined, not wanting to be thought of as simply using it for political gain. In his view, acceptance under such circumstances could have discredited the nascent organization and himself and harmed his chances for a future in politics.

Ted resumed his reserve service between the wars. He attended the annual summer camps at Pine Camp and completed both the Infantry Officer's Basic and Advanced Courses, and the Command and General Staff College. By the beginning of World War II, in September 1939, he was eligible for senior commissioned service.

In 1919 he became a member of the Empire State Society of the Sons of the American Revolution.

== Political career ==
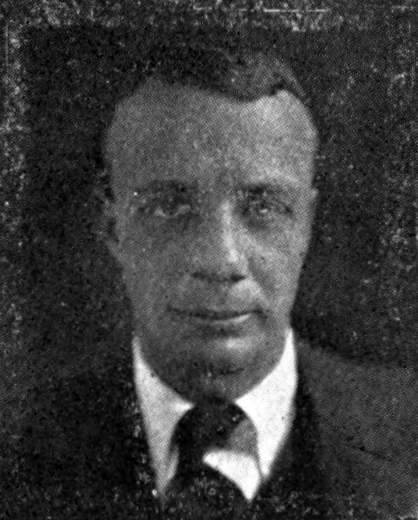
Roosevelt's official State Assembly portrait, 1920

After service in World War I, Roosevelt began his political career. Grinning like his father, waving a crumpled hat, and like his father, shouting "bully", he participated in every national campaign that he could, except when he was Governor-General of the Philippines. Elected as a member of the New York State Assembly (Nassau County, 2nd D.) in 1920 and 1921, Roosevelt was one of the few legislators who opposed the expulsion of five Socialist assemblymen in 1920. Anxiety about Socialists was high at the time.

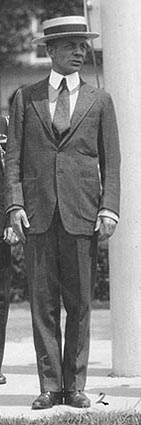
As Assistant Secretary of the Navy in 1923, Newport, Rhode Island

On March 10, 1921, Roosevelt was appointed by President Warren G. Harding as Assistant Secretary of the Navy. He oversaw the transferring of oil leases for federal lands in Wyoming and California from the Navy to the Department of Interior, and ultimately, to private corporations. Established as the Navy's petroleum reserves by President Taft, the properties consisted of three oil fields: Naval Petroleum Reserve No. 3, Teapot Dome Field, Natrona County, Wyoming; and Naval Petroleum Reserve No. 1 at Elk Hills Oil Field and Naval Petroleum Reserve No. 2 Buena Vista Oil Field, both in Kern County, California. In 1922, Albert B. Fall, U.S. Secretary of the Interior, leased the Teapot Dome Field to Harry F. Sinclair of Sinclair Consolidated Oil Company, and the field at Elk Hills, California, to Edward L. Doheny of Pan American Petroleum & Transport Company, both without competitive bidding.

During the transfers, while Roosevelt was Assistant Secretary of the Navy, his brother Archie was vice president of the Union Petroleum Company, the export auxiliary subsidiary of the Sinclair Consolidated Oil. The leasing of government reserves without competitive bidding, plus the close personal and business relationships among the players, led to the deal being called the Teapot Dome scandal. The connection between the Roosevelt brothers could not be ignored.

After Sinclair sailed for Europe to avoid testifying in Congressional hearings, G. D. Wahlberg, Sinclair's private secretary, advised Archibald Roosevelt to resign to save his reputation. The Senate Committee on Public Lands held hearings over a period of six months to investigate the actions of Fall in leasing the public lands without the required competitive bidding. Although both Archibald and Ted Roosevelt were cleared of all charges by the Senate Committee on Public Lands, their images were tarnished.

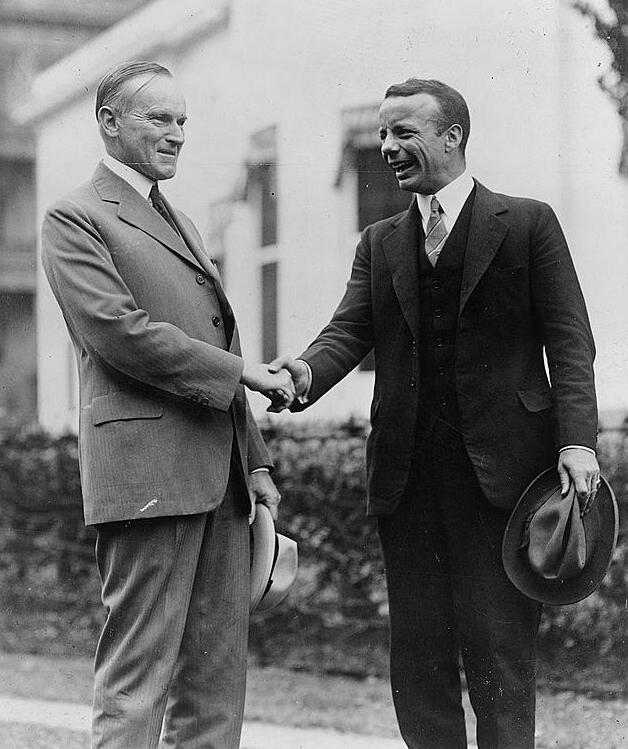
Roosevelt shaking hands with President Calvin Coolidge, September 26, 1924

At the 1924 New York state election, Roosevelt was the Republican nominee for Governor of New York. His cousin Franklin Delano Roosevelt (FDR) spoke out on Ted's "wretched record" as Assistant Secretary of the Navy during the oil scandals. In return, Ted said of FDR: "He's a maverick! He does not wear the brand of our family." Eleanor Roosevelt, more closely related to Ted by blood but married to FDR, had been infuriated by these remarks. She dogged Ted on the New York State campaign trail in a car fitted with a papier-mâché bonnet shaped like a giant teapot that was made to emit simulated steam, and countered his speeches with those of her own, calling him immature.

She would later decry these methods, admitting that they were below her dignity but saying that they had been contrived by Democratic Party "dirty tricksters." Ted's opponent, incumbent governor Alfred E. Smith, defeated him by 105,000 votes. Ted never forgave Eleanor for her stunt, though his elder half-sister Alice did, and resumed their formerly close friendship. These conflicts served to widen the split between the Oyster Bay (TR) and Hyde Park (FDR) wings of the Roosevelt family.

== Governor of Puerto Rico ==
Along with his brother, Kermit, Roosevelt spent most of 1929 on a zoological expedition and was the first Westerner known to have shot a panda. In September 1929, President Herbert Hoover appointed Roosevelt as Governor of Puerto Rico, and he served until 1932. (Until 1947, when it became an electoral office, this was a political appointee position.) Roosevelt worked to ease the poverty of the people during the Great Depression. He attracted money to build secondary schools, raised money from American philanthropists, marketed Puerto Rico as a location for manufacturing, and made other efforts to improve the Puerto Rican economy.

He worked to create more ties to U.S. institutions for mutual benefit. For instance, he arranged for Cayetano Coll y Cuchi to be invited to Harvard Law School to lecture about Puerto Rico's legal system. He arranged for Antonio Reyes Delgado of the Puerto Rican Legislative Assembly to speak to a conference of Civil Service Commissioners in New York City. Roosevelt worked to educate Americans about the island and its people, and to promote the image of Puerto Rico in the rest of the U.S.

Roosevelt was the first American governor to study Spanish and tried to learn 20 words a day. He was fond of local Puerto Rican culture and assumed many of the island's traditions. He became known as El Jíbaro de La Fortaleza ("The Hillbilly of the Governor's Mansion") by locals. In 1931 he appointed Carlos E. Chardón, a mycologist, as the first Puerto Rican to be Chancellor of the University of Puerto Rico.

== Governor-General of the Philippines ==
Impressed with his work in Puerto Rico, President Hoover appointed Roosevelt as Governor-General of the Philippines in 1932. During his time in office, Roosevelt acquired the nickname "One Shot Teddy" among the Filipino population, in reference to his marksmanship during a hunt for tamaraw (wild pygmy water buffalo).

In the 1932 United States presidential election, when Franklin D. Roosevelt challenged Hoover for the presidency, Alice begged Ted to return from the Philippines to aid the campaign. Roosevelt announced to the press on August 22, 1932, that "Circumstances have made it necessary for me to return for a brief period to the United States..... I shall start for the Philippines again the first week in November..... While there I hope I can accomplish something."

The reaction of many in the U.S. press was so negative that within a few weeks, Governor-General Roosevelt arranged to stay in Manila throughout the campaign. U.S. Secretary of War Patrick J. Hurley cabled Ted, "The President has reached the conclusion that you should not leave your duties for the purpose of participating in the campaign.... He believes it to be your duty to remain at your post." Roosevelt resigned as Governor-General after the election of FDR as president, as the new administration would appoint their own people. He thought that the potential for war in Europe meant another kind of opportunity for him. Using his father's language, he wrote to his wife as he sailed for North Africa, saying that he had done his best and his fate was now "at the knees of the gods".

== Return to the U.S. mainland ==
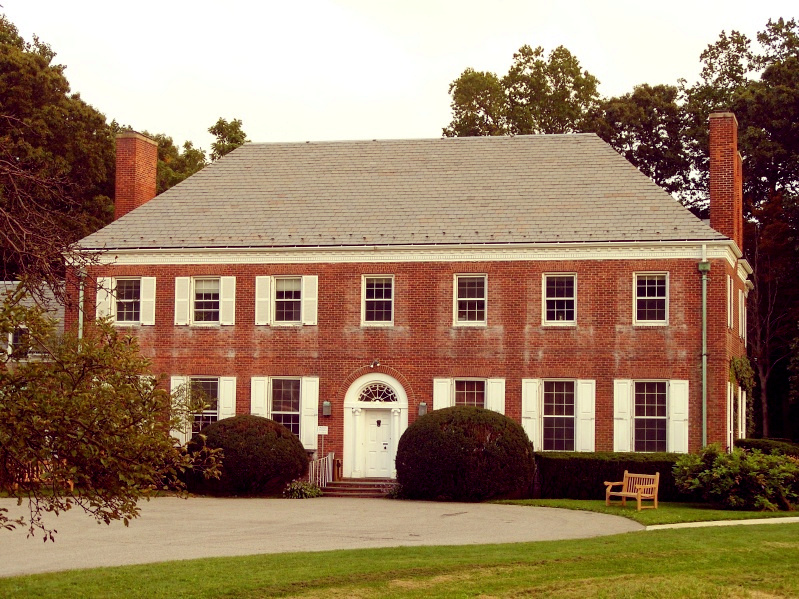
Old Orchard, Ted's estate in Oyster Bay – within walking distance of his father's house, Sagamore Hill – is now the Theodore Roosevelt Museum at Old Orchard, part of the Sagamore Hill National Historic Site.

During the 1932 presidential campaign of his cousin FDR, Roosevelt said, "Franklin is such poor stuff it seems improbable that he should be elected President." When Franklin won the election and Ted was asked just how he was related to FDR, Ted quipped "fifth cousin, about to be removed."

In 1935, he returned to the United States and first became a vice president of the publishing house Doubleday, Doran & Company. He next served as an executive with American Express. He also served on the boards of numerous non-profit organizations. He was invited by Irving Berlin to help oversee the disbursement of royalties for Berlin's popular song, "God Bless America," to charity. While living again in New York, the Roosevelts renewed old friendships with playwright Alexander Woollcott and comedian Harpo Marx.

He was also mentioned as a potential candidate for the 1936 Republican presidential nomination, but did not mount a campaign. Had he received the 1936 Republican presidential nomination, he would have faced off against his cousin Franklin in the general election. After Alf Landon received the Republican presidential nomination, Roosevelt was also mentioned as a candidate for vice president, but that nomination went to Frank Knox. Roosevelt was also mentioned as a candidate for Governor of New York in 1936, but made no effort to become an active candidate.

== World War II service and death ==
In 1940, during World War II (although the United States had not yet entered the war and remained neutral) Roosevelt attended a military refresher course offered to many businessmen as an advanced student, and was promoted to colonel in the Army of the United States.

Roosevelt's wife personally asked Army Chief of Staff George C. Marshall to return him to a combat unit despite his past hospitalization. Although Marshall typically refused such political favoritism he remarked that he would make an exception "if what you wanted was a more dangerous job than what you had" and agreed. Roosevelt returned to active duty in April 1941 and was given command of the 26th Infantry Regiment, part of the 1st Infantry Division, the same unit he fought with in World War I. Late in 1941, he was promoted to brigadier general.

=== North Africa ===
Upon his arrival in North Africa, Roosevelt became known as a general who often visited the front lines. He had always preferred the heat of the battle to the comfort of the command post, and this attitude would culminate in his actions in France on D-Day.

Roosevelt led the 26th Infantry in an attack on Oran, Algeria, on November 8, 1942, as part of Operation Torch, the Allies' invasion of North Africa. During 1943, he was the Assistant Division Commander (ADC) of the 1st Infantry Division in the campaign in North Africa under Major General Terry Allen. He was cited for the Croix de Guerre by the military commander of French Africa, General Alphonse Juin:

As commander of a Franco-American detachment on the Ousseltia plain in the region of Pichon, in the face of a very aggressive enemy, he showed the finest qualities of decision and determination in the defense of his sector. Showing complete contempt for personal danger, he never ceased during the period of Jan 28 – Feb 21, visiting troops in the front lines, making vital decisions on the spot, winning the esteem and admiration of the units under his command and developing throughout his detachment the finest fraternity of arms.

=== Clashes with Patton ===
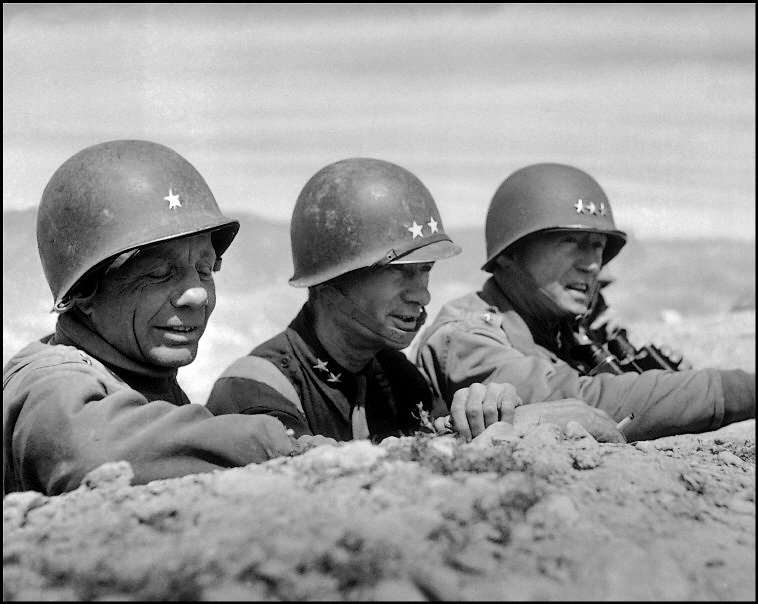
From left to right, Brigadier Theodore Roosevelt Jr., Major General Terry Allen and Lieutenant General George S. Patton, March 1943.

Roosevelt collaborated with and was a friend of his commander, the hard-fighting, hard-drinking Major General Terry de la Mesa Allen Sr. Their unorthodox approach to warfare did not escape the attention of Lieutenant General George S. Patton, the Seventh Army commander in Sicily, and formerly the II Corps commander. Patton disapproved of such officers who "dressed down" and were seldom seen in regulation field uniforms, and who placed little value in Patton's spit-shined ways in the field. Patton thought them both un-soldierly for it and wasted no opportunity to send derogatory reports on Allen to General Dwight D. Eisenhower, the Supreme Allied Commander in the Mediterranean Theater of Operations (MTO). Roosevelt was also treated by Patton as "guilty by association" for his friendship and collaboration with the highly unorthodox Allen. When Allen was relieved of command of the 1st Division and reassigned, so was Roosevelt.

After criticizing Allen in his diary on July 31, 1943, Patton noted that he had asked permission of Eisenhower "to relieve both Allen and Roosevelt on the same terms, on the theory of rotation of command", and added, concerning Roosevelt, "there will be a kick over Teddy, but he has to go, brave but otherwise, no soldier." Later, however, upon hearing of the death of Roosevelt, Patton wrote in his diary that Roosevelt was "one of the bravest men I've ever known", and a few days later served as a pallbearer at his funeral.

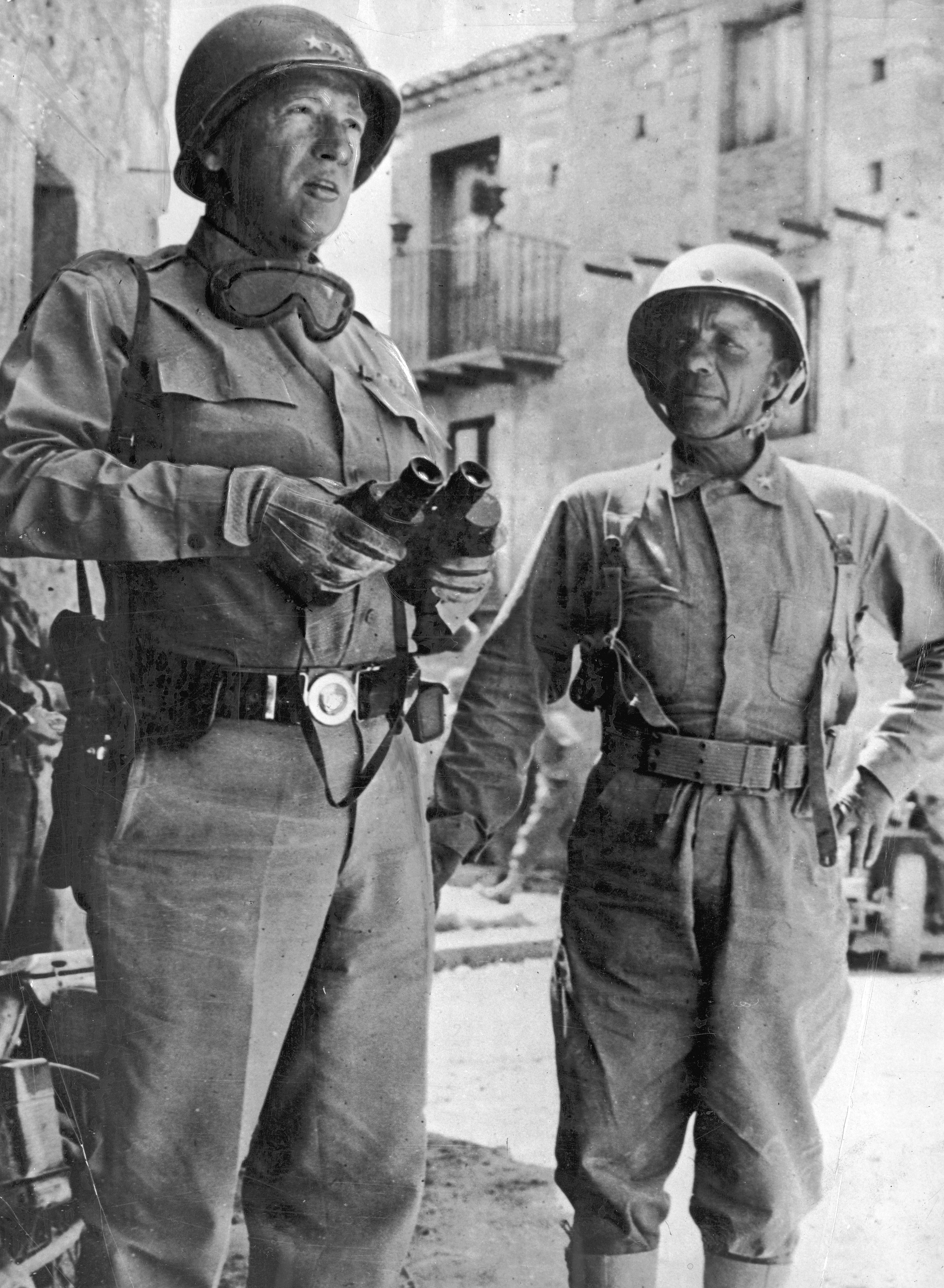
Lieutenant General George S. Patton and Brigadier General Theodore Roosevelt Jr., during the invasion of Sicily, 1943.

Roosevelt was also criticized by Lieutenant General Omar Bradley, the II Corps commander, who ultimately relieved both Roosevelt and Allen. In both of his autobiographies – A Soldier's Story (1951) and A General's Life – Bradley claimed that relieving the two generals was one of his most unpleasant duties of the war. Bradley felt that Allen and Roosevelt were guilty of "loving their division too much" and that their relationship with their soldiers was having a generally bad effect on the discipline of both the commanders and the men of the division.

Roosevelt was assistant commander of the 1st Infantry Division at Gela during the Allied invasion of Sicily, codenamed Operation Husky, commanded Allied Forces in Sardinia, and fought on the Italian mainland. He was the chief liaison officer to the French Expeditionary Corps in Italy for General Eisenhower, and repeatedly made requests of Eisenhower for combat command.

=== D-Day ===
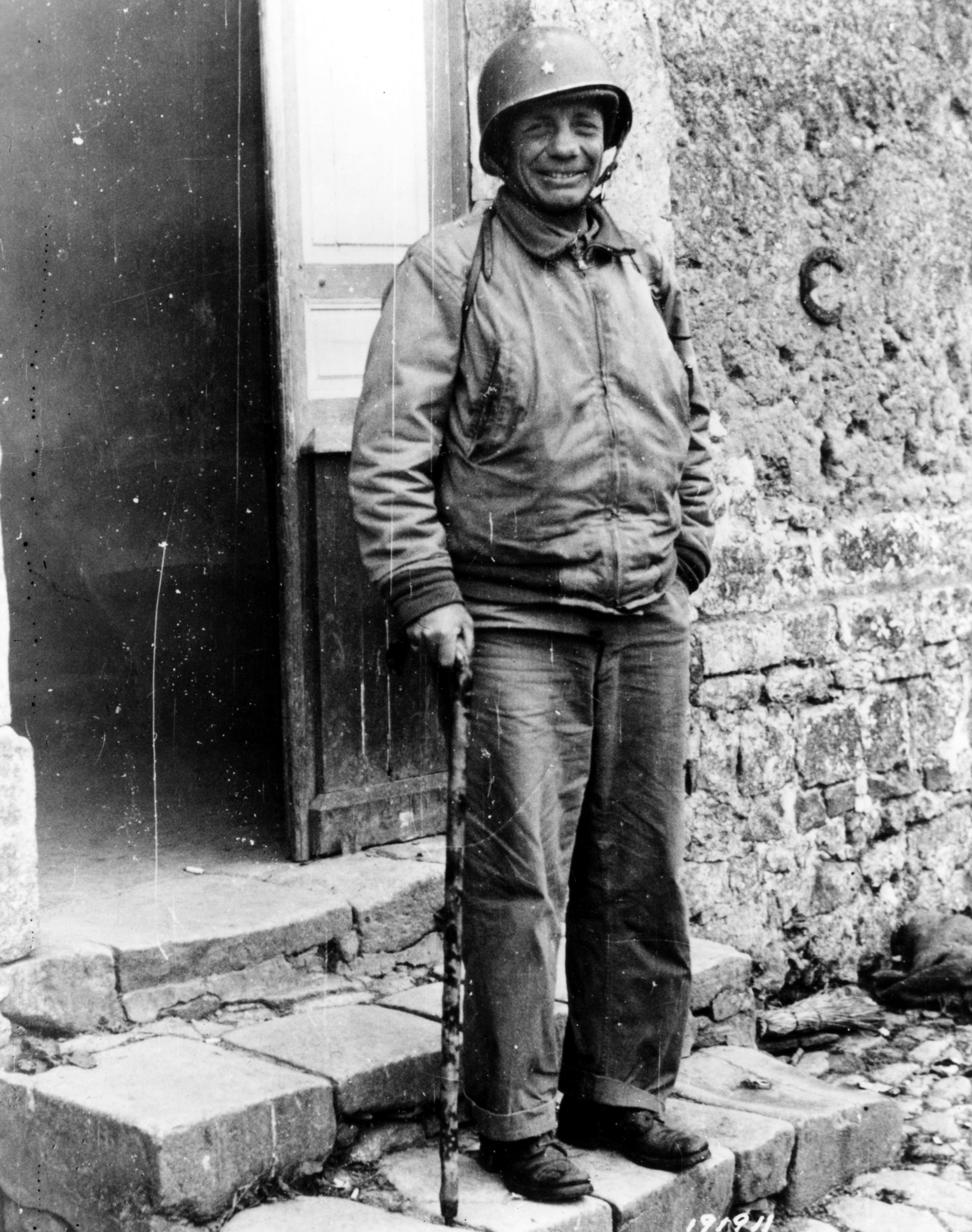
Despite a heart condition and arthritis that forced him to use a cane, Brigadier General Roosevelt led the assault on Utah Beach.

In February 1944, Roosevelt was assigned to England to help lead the Normandy invasion and appointed Deputy Division Commander of the 4th Infantry Division. After several verbal requests to the division's Commanding General (CG), Major General Raymond "Tubby" Barton, to go ashore on D-Day with the Division were denied, Roosevelt sent a written petition:

The force and skill with which the first elements hit the beach and proceed may determine the ultimate success of the operation.... With troops engaged for the first time, the behavior pattern of all is apt to be set by those first engagements. [It is] considered that accurate information of the existing situation should be available for each succeeding element as it lands. You should have when you get to shore an overall picture in which you can place confidence. I believe I can contribute materially on all of the above by going in with the assault companies. Furthermore I personally know both officers and men of these advance units and believe that it will steady them to know that I am with them.

Barton approved Roosevelt's written request with much misgiving, stating that he did not expect Roosevelt to return alive.

Roosevelt was the only general on D-Day to land by sea with the first wave of troops. At 56, he was the oldest man in the invasion, and the only one whose son also landed that day; Captain Quentin Roosevelt II was among the first wave of soldiers at Omaha Beach.

Brigadier General Roosevelt was one of the first soldiers, along with Captain Leonard T. Schroeder Jr., off his landing craft as he led the 8th Infantry Regiment and 70th Tank Battalion landing at Utah Beach. Roosevelt was soon informed that the landing craft had drifted south of their objective, and the first wave of men was a mile off course. Walking with the aid of a cane and carrying a pistol, he personally made a reconnaissance of the area immediately to the rear of the beach to locate the causeways that were to be used for the advance inland. He returned to the point of landing and contacted the commanders of the two battalions, Lieutenant Colonels Conrad C. Simmons and Carlton O. MacNeely, and coordinated the attack on the enemy positions confronting them. Opting to fight from where they had landed rather than trying to move to their assigned positions, Roosevelt's famous words were, "We'll start the war from right here!"

These impromptu plans worked with complete success and little confusion. With artillery landing close by, each follow-on regiment was personally welcomed on the beach by a cool, calm, and collected Roosevelt, who inspired all with humor and confidence, reciting poetry and telling anecdotes of his father to steady the nerves of his men. Roosevelt pointed almost every regiment to its changed objective. Sometimes he worked under fire as a self-appointed traffic cop, untangling traffic jams of trucks and tanks all struggling to get inland and off the beach. One GI later reported that seeing the general walking around, apparently unaffected by the enemy fire, even when clods of earth fell down on him, gave him the courage to get on with the job, saying if the general is like that it cannot be that bad.

When Major General Barton, the commander of the 4th Infantry Division, came ashore, he met Roosevelt not far from the beach. He later wrote:

While I was mentally framing [orders], Ted Roosevelt came up. He had landed with the first wave, had put my troops across the beach, and had a perfect picture (just as Roosevelt had earlier promised if allowed to go ashore with the first wave) of the entire situation. I loved Ted. When I finally agreed to his landing with the first wave, I felt sure he would be killed. When I had bade him goodbye, I never expected to see him alive. You can imagine then the emotion with which I greeted him when he came out to meet me [near La Grande Dune]. He was bursting with information.

By modifying his division's original plan on the beach, Roosevelt enabled its troops to achieve their mission objectives by coming ashore and attacking north behind the beach toward its original objective. Years later, Omar Bradley was asked to name the single most heroic action he had ever seen in combat. He replied, "Ted Roosevelt on Utah Beach."

Following the landing, Roosevelt utilized a Jeep named "Rough Rider", which was the nickname of his father's regiment raised during the Spanish–American War. Before his death, Roosevelt was appointed as Military Governor of Cherbourg.

=== Death ===
Throughout World War II, Roosevelt suffered from health problems. He had arthritis, mostly from old World War I injuries, and walked with a cane. He also had heart trouble, which he kept secret from army doctors and his superiors.

On July 12, 1944, a little over one month after the landing at Utah Beach, Roosevelt died of a heart attack in France. He was living at the time in a converted sleeping truck, captured a few days before from the Germans. He had spent part of the day in a long conversation with his son, Captain Quentin Roosevelt II, who had also landed at Normandy on D-Day. He was stricken at about 10:00 pm, attended by medical help, and died at about midnight. He was 56 years old. On the day of his death, he had been selected by Lieutenant General Omar Bradley, now commanding the U.S. First Army, for promotion to the two-star rank of major general and command of the 90th Infantry Division. These recommendations were sent to General Eisenhower, now the Supreme Allied Commander in Europe. Eisenhower approved the assignment, but Roosevelt died before the battlefield promotion. Of his death, Patton wrote: "Teddy R[oosevelt] died in his sleep last night. He had made three landings with the leading wave — such is fate... He was one of the bravest men I ever knew".

Roosevelt was initially buried at Sainte-Mère-Église. Photographs show that his honorary pallbearers were generals, including Omar N. Bradley, George S. Patton, Raymond O. Barton, Clarence R. Huebner, Courtney Hicks Hodges, and J. Lawton Collins, the VII Corps commander. Later, Roosevelt was buried at the American cemetery in Normandy, initially created for the Americans killed in Normandy during the invasion. His younger brother, Second Lieutenant Quentin Roosevelt, had been killed in action as a pilot in France during World War I and was initially buried near where he had been shot down in that war. In 1955, his family had his body exhumed and moved to the Normandy cemetery, where he was re-interred beside his brother. Ted also has a cenotaph near the grave of his parents at Youngs Memorial Cemetery in Oyster Bay, while Quentin's original gravestone was moved to Sagamore Hill.

Theodore Roosevelt Jr.'s grave marker at the American World War II cemetery in Normandy. He lies buried next to his brother, Quentin, who was killed during World War I.

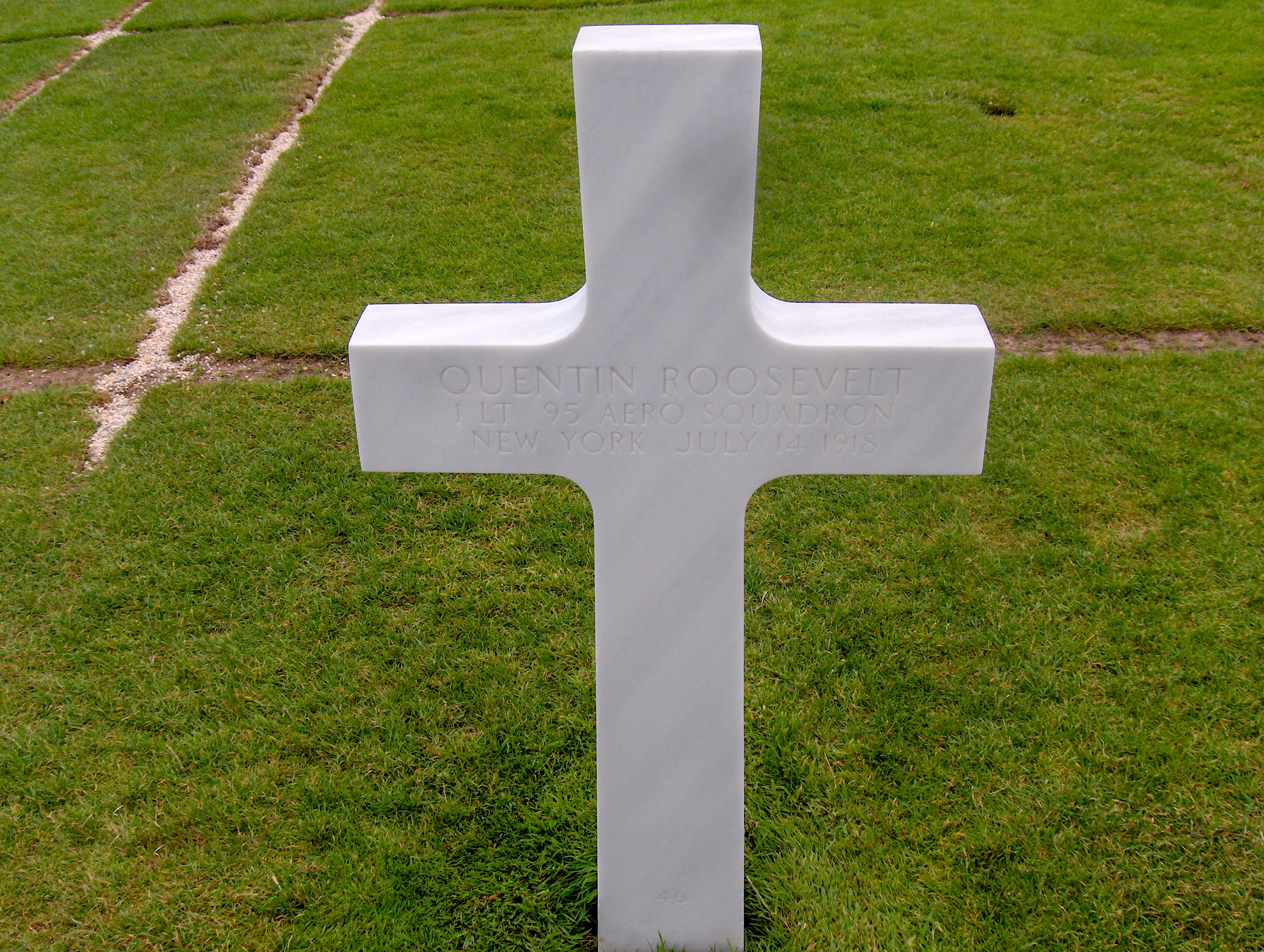
Quentin Roosevelt's grave at Normandy Cemetery.

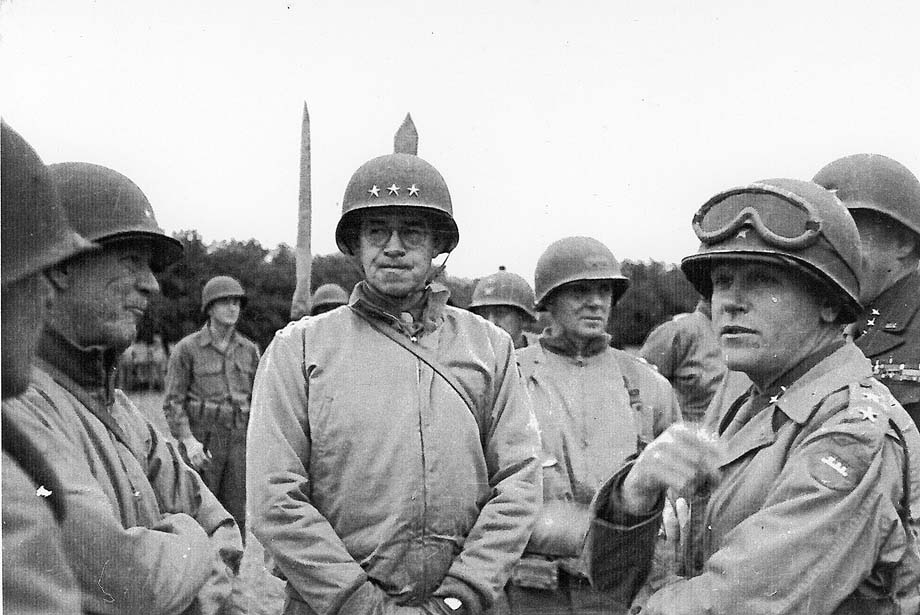
General officers including Omar Bradley and Gen. J. Lawton Collins (with goggles) attending Roosevelt's funeral. General Clarence Huebner is visible behind Bradley, and George Patton is partially visible behind Collins.

=== Medal of Honor ===
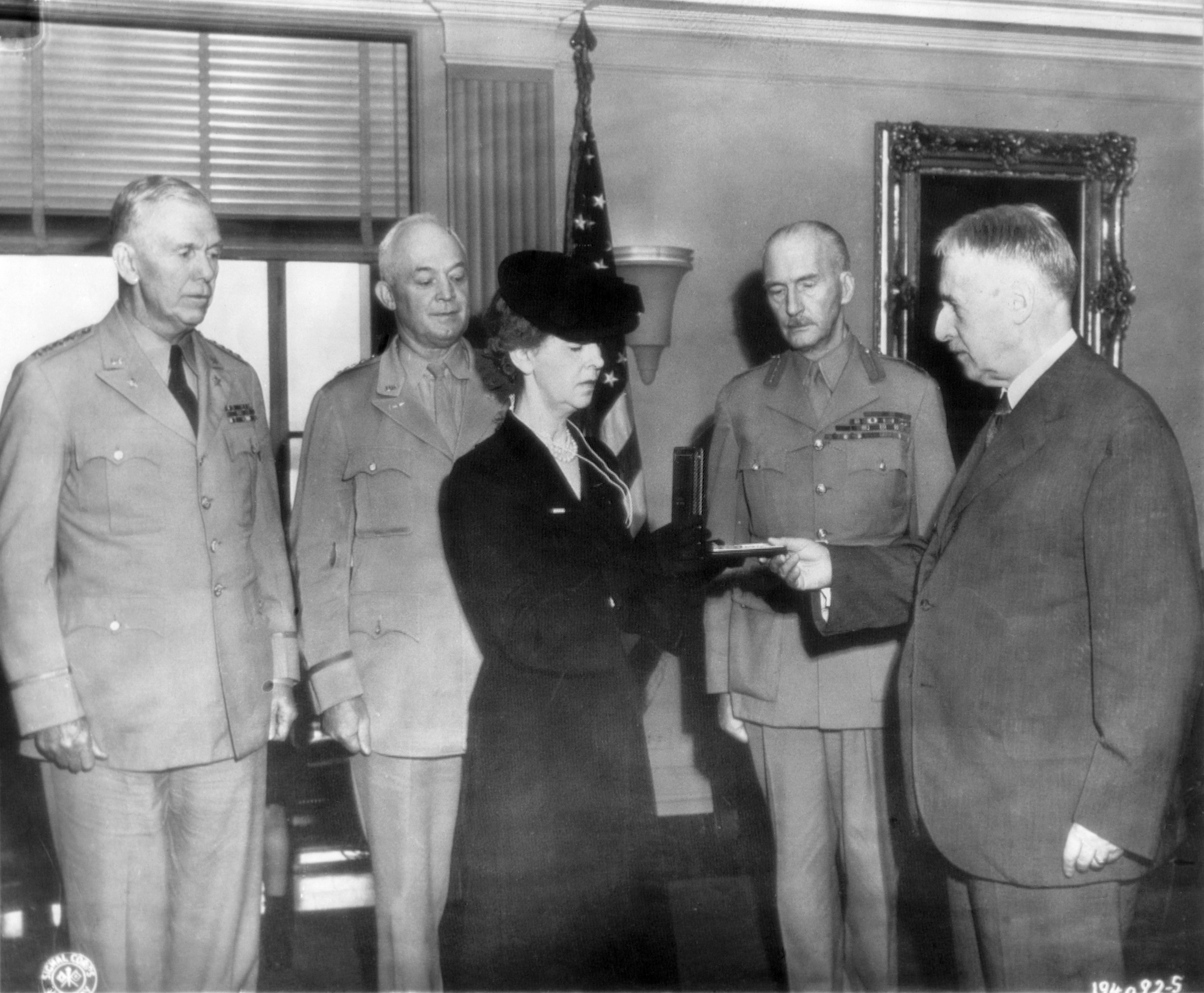
Eleanor Butler Roosevelt receives the Medal of Honor posthumously presented to her husband (September 21, 1944). From left: Gen. George Marshall, U.S. Army Chief of Staff; Gen. Henry H. Arnold, commanding U.S. Army Air Forces; Mrs. Roosevelt; British Field Marshal Sir John Dill; and Secretary of War Henry L. Stimson.

Roosevelt was originally recommended for the Distinguished Service Cross by General Barton. The recommendation was upgraded at higher headquarters to the Medal of Honor, which was approved, and which Roosevelt was posthumously awarded on September 21, 1944. Theodore Roosevelt, Jr., and his father, Theodore Roosevelt, remain one of only two father/son duos to receive the Medal of Honor, the other pair being Arthur and Douglas MacArthur. Roosevelt was also one of two sons of presidents of the United States to be awarded the Medal of Honor, the other being Webb Hayes.

For gallantry and intrepidity at the risk of his life above and beyond the call of duty on 6 June 1944, in France. After two verbal requests to accompany the leading assault elements in the Normandy invasion had been denied, Brig. Gen. Roosevelt's written request for this mission was approved and he landed with the first wave of the forces assaulting the enemy-held beaches. He repeatedly led groups from the beach, over the seawall and established them inland. His valor, courage, and presence in the very front of the attack and his complete unconcern at being under heavy fire inspired the troops to heights of enthusiasm and self-sacrifice. Although the enemy had the beach under constant direct fire, Brig. Gen. Roosevelt moved from one locality to another, rallying men around him, directed and personally led them against the enemy. Under his seasoned, precise, calm, and unfaltering leadership, assault troops reduced beach strong points and rapidly moved inland with minimum casualties. He thus contributed substantially to the successful establishment of the beachhead in France.

== Family ==
On June 20, 1910, Roosevelt married Eleanor Butler Alexander (1888–1960), daughter of Henry Addison Alexander and Grace Green. Ted and Eleanor had four children: Grace (1911–1994), Theodore (1914–2001), Cornelius (1915–1991), and Quentin (1919–1948).

== Military awards ==
General Roosevelt's military awards include:

1st row	Medal of Honor	Distinguished Service Cross	Army Distinguished Service Medal
2nd row	Silver Star with 3 Oak leaf clusters	Legion of Merit	Bronze Star Medal
3rd row	Purple Heart	World War I Victory Medal with 5 Campaign stars	American Defense Service Medal
4th row	American Campaign Medal	European–African–Middle Eastern Campaign Medal with Arrowhead Device and 4 Campaign stars	World War II Victory Medal

1st Infantry Division Insignia	4th Infantry Division Insignia

Legion of Honor	Croix de Guerre	French Liberation Medal

== Civilian honors ==
Theodore Roosevelt Jr. is honored in the scientific names of two species of Caribbean lizards: Anolis roosevelti and Sphaerodactylus roosevelti. Both species were named and described in 1931 by American herpetologist Chapman Grant, a grandson of U.S. President Ulysses S. Grant.

== Representation in other media ==
- Roosevelt's actions on D-Day are portrayed in The Longest Day, a 1962 film in which he was played by actor Henry Fonda. The movie is based on the 1959 book of the same name by Cornelius Ryan.
- Roosevelt's life, political views, and actions are documented in the 2014 miniseries The Roosevelts, directed by Ken Burns.

== See also ==
- List of governors of Puerto Rico
- List of Medal of Honor recipients for World War II
- List of members of the American Legion

== Notes ==
New York State Assembly
Preceded by Franklin A. Coles	New York State Assembly; Nassau County, 2nd District; 1920–1921	Succeeded by F. Trubee Davison
Government offices
Preceded by Gordon Woodbury	Assistant Secretary of the Navy; 1921–1924	Succeeded by Theodore Douglas Robinson
Preceded by James R. Beverley	Governor of Puerto Rico; September 9, 1929 – January 1932	Succeeded by James R. Beverley
Preceded by Dwight F. Davis	Governor-General of the Philippines; 1932–1933	Succeeded by Frank Murphy
Party political offices
Preceded by Nathan L. Miller	Republican Nominee for Governor of New York; 1924	Succeeded by Ogden L. Mills
