= Tweed Roosevelt =

American businessman

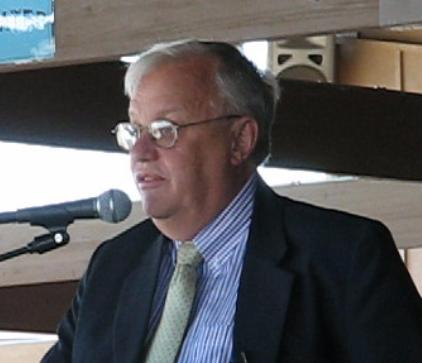
- Tweed Roosevelt in 2007
- Born: Tweed Roosevelt; February 28, 1942 (age 84); Berkeley, California, U.S.
- Education: Harvard University (AB); Columbia University (MBA)
- Occupations: Businessman, family historian and lecturer
- Spouse: Candace C. MacGuigan (m. 1980)
- Children: 2
- Parent(s): Archibald Bulloch Roosevelt Jr. Katherine Winthrop Tweed
- Relatives: Archibald Roosevelt (grandfather); Theodore Roosevelt (great-grandfather)
- Family: Roosevelt family

Tweed Roosevelt (/ˈroʊzəvɛlt/ ROH-zə-velt; born February 28, 1942) commonly referred by his initials T.R. is an American businessman, family historian, lecturer and prominent member of the Roosevelt family. He is the son of Archibald Bulloch Roosevelt Jr., grandson of Archibald Roosevelt and great-grandson of President Theodore Roosevelt.

Roosevelt is the chairman of Roosevelt China Investments, a private investment firm, based in Boston and Shanghai. He is the president of the board of trustees for the Theodore Roosevelt Association, and the chairman of the Theodore Roosevelt Institute at Long Island University. He is a co-founder and president of the Society of Presidential Descendants, an organization created to bring together direct and collateral descendants of U.S. presidents and promote education about the presidency.

== Early life and education ==
Roosevelt was born February 28, 1942, in Berkeley, California, to Archibald Bulloch Roosevelt Jr. and his first wife Katherine Winthrop (née Tweed; 1920-2009). His paternal grandfather was Archibald Roosevelt, Sr., the third son of Theodore Roosevelt. His maternal grandfather was Harrison Tweed, the grandson of William M. Evarts.

Roosevelt attended the Millbrook School in Millbrook, New York, and later graduated from Harvard College with a bachelor's degree. He subsequently earned an MBA from Columbia Business School. During his freshman year at Harvard, Roosevelt was involved as a driver in an accident that sent two sophomores to the hospital.

== Career ==
In his early career, Roosevelt held several positions from 1967 to 1974. Most notably he was a special assistant to the Administrator of the largest New York City government agency. He worked as staff administrator and treasurer of a non-partisan commission studying the selection process of U.S. presidential nominees. Roosevelt also worked as a VISTA volunteer involved in community action and anti-drug programs in the slums of New York City, and spent some time in the employ of the United States Forest Service at the Carson National Forest in Taos, New Mexico.

After graduating from Harvard, Roosevelt served for two years as a VISTA volunteer in Harlem, Bedford-Stuyvesant and the Lower East Side of New York City before working for the city's Human Resources Administration.

From 1979 to 1983, Roosevelt was a consultant with the MAC Group. He then served as vice president of Gray-Judson & Howard, Inc. from 1983 to 1987, as an investment adviser at the Wingate Financial Group from 1987 to 1992, and as president of the Roosevelt Investment Group, Inc. from 1992 to 1996. From 1996 to 1998, he was a vice president at the Center for Blood Research.

Roosevelt has also served as spokesperson for Steiff, an international company headquartered in Giengen, Germany, that manufactures extremely high quality collectible plush animals, including Teddy Bears. At the beginning of the 20th century, Steiff was the initiator of the original Teddy Bear, which was named after President Theodore Roosevelt. Roosevelt currently chairs his family investment firm, Roosevelt China Investments, which is based in Boston and Shanghai. The firm was primarily known for a failed venture to bring Saks Fifth Avenue retail stores to China. Tweed Roosevelt frequently teaches high school students attending Long Island University's Roosevelt Summer Honor Institute program. He leads them in discussions of various documentaries, literary texts, and also provides tours through Theodore Roosevelt's home in Sagamore Hill, which he grew up in as a child. This is an annual program, that began in the summer of 2019.

== Rio Roosevelt Expedition (1992) ==
In 1992, Roosevelt spent his 50th birthday rafting the approximately 1,000-mile Rio Roosevelt in Brazil, retracing the route explored by his great-grandfather during the 1913–14 Roosevelt–Rondon Scientific Expedition. The Theodore Roosevelt Association later listed the Rio Roosevelt Expedition among the recipients of its 1992 Distinguished Service Medal.

== Family historian (Theodore Roosevelt) ==
Roosevelt has frequently lectured and contributed to projects concerning the life of Theodore Roosevelt. In 2006, he delivered the lecture "Re-enacting Roosevelt: Insights and Challenges" at the Theodore Roosevelt Symposium at Dickinson State University. He also participated in the 2007 symposium, "Theodore Roosevelt and America's Place in the World Arena," where he spoke on "Roosevelt in the Caribbean."

Roosevelt has long been active in the Theodore Roosevelt Association (TRA). By 2007 he was serving on its executive committee, and the Theodore Roosevelt Center later recorded his selection as chair of the organization.

In 2008, he travelled to San Juan, Puerto Rico, to unveil a statue of President Theodore Roosevelt commissioned by then Senate President Kenneth McClintock and House Speaker José Aponte, to commemorate the President's visit to Puerto Rico almost a century before. Tweed's great-uncle, Theodore Roosevelt Jr., served as Governor of Puerto Rico in the early 20th century.

In 2012, Roosevelt with Theodore Roosevelt Association member, Major Keith F. Simon, USMCR (Ret), led a group of 90 members of the TRA on a U.S. government-licensed educational trip to Cuba, where the group retraced Theodore Roosevelt's route to Kettle and San Juan Hills during the Spanish–American War Tweed gave a lecture to the group on Theodore Roosevelt's role in the Battle of San Juan Heights noting that TR led from the front.

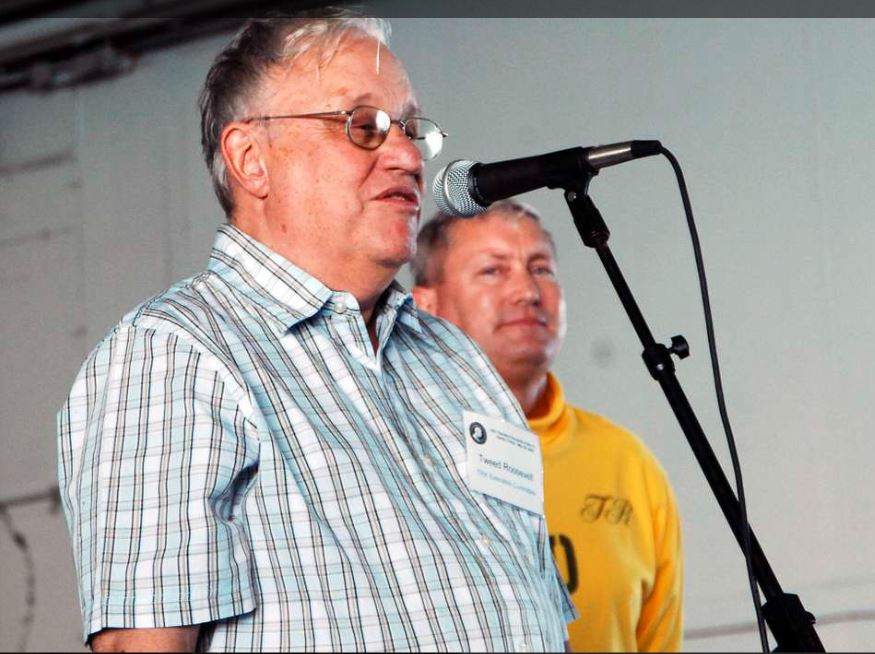
Tweed Roosevelt speaking aboard the USS Theodore Roosevelt (CVN-71) during a Friends and Family Day Cruise, May 30, 2009.

Always a supporter of the USS Theodore Roosevelt (CVN-71), on May 30, 2009, Roosevelt joined hundreds of Theodore Roosevelt Association members and other guests aboard the aircraft carrier for a Friends and Family Day Cruise. Roosevelt was photographed helping to launch an F/N-18 from the ship. Navy imagery from the event shows Roosevelt addressing crew members and guests in the carrier's hangar bay.

In February 2021, Roosevelt joined the faculty of Long Island University as chairman of the Theodore Roosevelt Institute and the Roosevelt School. The Institute offers studies in international relations, diplomacy, leadership, and national service inspired by Theodore Roosevelt.

== Society of Presidential Descendants ==
The idea for the Society of Presidential Descendants originated in 2018, when Roosevelt and Massee McKinley met at a White House Historical Association event in Washington, D.C., and discussed creating a national organization for presidential descendants. The Society was formally announced in February 2021, with Roosevelt serving as president. He led its formation with McKinley, Lynda Johnson Robb, and Clifton Truman Daniel.

== Personal life ==
On June 8, 1980, Roosevelt married Candace C. MacGuigan at Brick Presbyterian Church in New York City. The White House Historical Association states that Roosevelt has two children and has lived in Boston and on Martha's Vineyard.

Roosevelt later married Leslie Dangel Roosevelt. She died on March 23, 2011. Her obituary in the Vineyard Gazette identifies Tweed Roosevelt as her husband and Winthrop and Amanda Roosevelt as her stepchildren.
