= National Use Your Gift Card Day =

American annual shopping day in January

- Observances: Shopping and redeeming unused gift cards
- Date: Third Saturday in January
- 2024 date: January 20
- 2025 date: January 18
- 2026 date: January 17
- 2027 date: January 16
- Frequency: annual

National Use Your Gift Card Day is a shopping holiday in the United States that takes place yearly on the third Saturday of January. It is an unofficial observance with the inaugural observance having taken place on January 18, 2020. National Use Your Gift Card Day encourages people to remember to use their gift cards.

Based on an estimate from the Mercator Advisory Group, nearly $100 billion per year is spent on holiday gift cards, but as much as 3% of the cards will never get redeemed. The observance has been recognized by Chase’s Calendar of Events and by the Registrar at National Day Calendar. The idea gained traction in the retail industry, with major chains supporting the holiday.

National Use Your Gift Card Day was founded by Tracy Tilson who formed a limited liability company to support the National Use Your Gift Card Day movement. National Use Your Gift Card Day is also a registered trademark.

== See also ==
- Black Friday (shopping) – Friday following Thanksgiving in the US
- Cyber Monday – Monday after the Thanksgiving holiday
- Small Business Saturday – Saturday after Thanksgiving to encourage purchases from small businesses in the United States
