= Society of Presidential Descendants =

American lineage society

The Society of Presidential Descendants

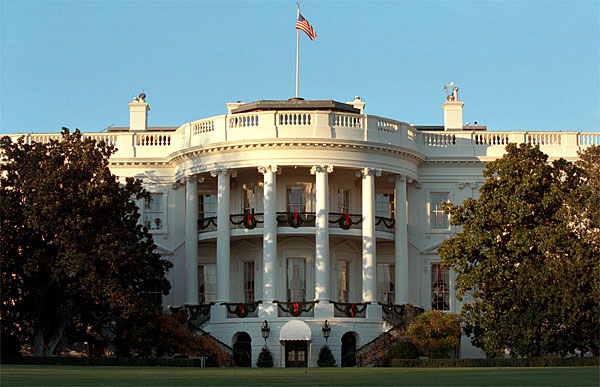
- Founder: Tweed Roosevelt; Massee McKinley
- Founded at: Washington, D.C.
- Type: lineage society
- Purpose: Historic preservation, education, patriotism
- Headquarters: Roosevelt School; Long Island University; Brooklyn, New York, U.S.
- President: Tweed Roosevelt
- Website: societyofpresidentialdescendants.org

The Society of Presidential Descendants is an American lineage society for descendants of Presidents of the United States. The society was founded by Tweed Roosevelt, a great-grandson of U.S. President Theodore Roosevelt, and Massee McKinley, a great-great grandson of President Grover Cleveland and great-grandnephew of President William McKinley, to promote historic preservation and education on the legacies of American presidents.

== History ==
The Society of Presidential Descendants was founded as a lineage society for direct and collateral descendants of people who served as president of the United States. It is an apolitical organization that focuses on historic preservation and education. The society was formed during an event hosted by the White House Historical Association in Washington, D.C.

The society meets annually on Presidents' Day at the Harry S. Truman Little White House in Key West, Florida. As of 2025, the society has 75 members who are direct descendants from 26 different U.S. presidents.

== Educational programs and forums ==
In 2021, the society collaborated with Rev. Nicholas W. Inman to form the National First Ladies Day Commission.

In June 2022, the society hosted an event at the Roosevelt School at Long Island University for descendants of Presidents James Monroe, Ulysses S. Grant, James Garfield, Grover Cleveland, Theodore Roosevelt, and Jimmy Carter to discuss personal experiences as members of presidential families. That same month, Jaimie Orr, a faculty member at the National War College, spoke before a meeting of the Society of Presidential Descendants about President Theodore Roosevelt's military career and Roosevelt's time as the Secretary of the United States Navy during the administration of President William McKinley.

In February 2024 and in 2025, the society hosted forums at the Harry S. Truman Little White House focused on the political influences of American presidents during their respective administrations. Participants in the forums included descendants of Presidents William H. Taft, Harry S. Truman, Dwight D. Eisenhower, and Jimmy Carter. In 2025, the speakers included Ulysses Grant Dietz, Clifton Truman Daniel, James Earl Carter IV, Massee McKinley, Mary Jean Eisenhower, and Tweed Roosevelt.

== Notable members ==
- Margaret Hayes Clark, great-granddaughter of Rutherford B. Hayes
- Clifton Truman Daniel, grandson of Harry S. Truman
- Susan Ford Bales, daughter of Gerald Ford
- Mary Jean Eisenhower, granddaughter of Dwight D. Eisenhower
- Margaret Hoover, great-granddaughter of Herbert Hoover
- Luci Baines Johnson, daughter of Lyndon B. Johnson
- Lynda Bird Johnson Robb, daughter of Lyndon B. Johnson
- Tweed Roosevelt, great-grandson of Theodore Roosevelt
- Bob Taft, great-grandson of William Howard Taft
- Patricia Taft, great-granddaughter of William Howard Taft

== See also ==
- List of children of presidents of the United States
