= Patricia Taft =

American interior designer

- Born: December 18, 1984 (age 40); Cincinnati, Ohio, U.S.
- Education: Vanderbilt University (BS); Harrington College of Design (MA)
- Occupation: interior designer
- Spouse: Christopher Swaine
- Children: 2
- Relatives: Robert A. Taft (grandfather); William Howard Taft (great-grandfather); Helen Herron Taft (great-grandmother); Bob Taft (cousin); William Howard Taft IV (cousin)

Patricia Moore Taft (born December 18, 1984) is an American interior architectural designer, philanthropist, and member of the Taft political dynasty. She is a granddaughter of U.S. Senator Robert A. Taft and a great-granddaughter of U.S. President William Howard Taft. Taft serves on the board of trustees of the Society of Presidential Descendants and is a charter member and member of the board of directors of the National First Ladies Day Commission.

== Early life, family, and education ==
Taft was born in Cincinnati, Ohio, on December 18, 1984, to Lloyd Bowers Taft Sr., an investment banker, and Carolyn Moore Taft, a real estate consultant. Her father was involved in the early days of Taft Broadcasting. A member of the Taft political dynasty, she is the granddaughter of U.S. Senator Robert A. Taft and a great-granddaughter of U.S. President William Howard Taft and First Lady Helen Herron Taft. She is a niece of William Howard Taft III, the former U.S. Ambassador to Ireland, and U.S. Senator Robert Taft Jr. She is a first cousin of former Ohio Governor Robert Alphonso Taft III and the diplomat William Howard Taft IV.

Taft is of African-American descent and identifies as both Black and biracial. In a 2023 interview with Raw Story, Taft stated that she is "the descendant of a U.S. president but.. also a Black person" and said that "the privilege of one does not negate the pain of the other."

She attended Cincinnati Country Day School, a private coeducational school. Taft graduated cum laude from Vanderbilt University, where she was a member of Delta Delta Delta, and earned a Master of Arts degree in interior architecture from Harrington College of Design.

== Career ==
Taft worked as an interior designer, interior architect, and as a fashion designer in New York City, Chicago, and Los Angeles prior to founding Patricia Taft Studio, an interior design and architectural firm. In Chicago, she was employed as an associate interior designer at Kara Mann Design.

She is involved in political, historic preservation, and education initiatives including the National Cherry Blossom Festival, the National First Ladies Day Commission, and the Society of Presidential Descendants. She serves on the board of trustees of the Society of Presidential Descendants and is a charter member, and member of the Board of Directors, for the National First Ladies Day Commission. As a member of both the society and the commission, Taft has made efforts to encourage the United States Congress to honor the First Ladies of the United States and acknowledge the impact they have made on American history by making National First Ladies Day a federal holiday. She was part of the initiative to get the holiday included on the National Day Calendar. Taft is also involved with the White House Historical Association and the Women's Suffrage National Monument Foundation.

== Personal life ==
Taft married Christopher Laurence Swaine, an investment consultant, in a Presbyterian ceremony on August 9, 2014, at the Bealieu Garden in Rutherford, California. The couple met in 2005, while both high school students, at the Cotillion Club of Cincinnati. They live in Santa Monica, California, and have two daughters.

She holds an honorary lifetime membership to the University Club of Washington, D.C. Despite coming from a prominent Republican family, Taft voted for Democratic presidential nominee Barack Obama in the 2008 United States presidential election.
