= Tom Keogh =

American costume designer (1922–1980)

Tom C. Keogh (1922 – 15 February 1980) was an international fashion illustrator, graphic artist, and set and costume designer who married dancer and novelist Theodora Keogh, née Roosevelt, the granddaughter of President Theodore Roosevelt. Born in San Francisco, Tom Keogh studied at the California School of Fine Arts and the Chouinard School of Painting (Los Angeles). In 1944 he moved to New York to work as an illustrator for Barbara Karinska, the theatre, ballet and film designer. After their wedding the Keoghs moved to Paris.

== Illustration ==
Tom Keogh was featured on the cover of French Vogue's Christmas issue in December 1947, and for the next four years he created many more covers for Vogue Paris as well as multiple illustrations within its pages. He drew sketches of clothes by couturiers Jeanne Lanvin, Nina Ricci, Jacques Griffe, Pierre Balmain, Schiaparelli, Christian Dior, Marcel Rochas, Jacques Heim and Edward Molyneux, as well as perfumes by Elizabeth Arden and Jean Dessès.

Keogh's work reflected a new spirit and panache and a simplified outline with a confident, nonchalant flick of the brush. But it was his use of vibrant primary colours twinned with black that set him apart from all other graphic artists of the period. He illustrated Mad Carpentier in 1948, Balenciaga in 1949, and a double picture of Lanvin and Balmain gowns in 1950. He also created covers for paperbacks for Barron's Educational Series, the Algerian Society's Dictionnaire des Femmes (1961, 1962) and James Leo Herlihy's The Sleep of Baby Flibertson (1958). He illustrated the covers for penguin books and novels by his wife Theodora Keogh: Meg (1951); Street Music (1951); The Double Door (1952); The Tattooed Heart (1952); and The Fascinator (1955).

During the late 1940s and early 1950s Keogh designed the annual Christmas windows for Galeries Lafayette department store in Paris.

After his divorce the couple remained lifelong friends but he eventually returned to New York, and there began to make fashion illustrations for New York Magazine. He also illustrated an edition of the poems of William Butler Yeats and designed the Berlin production of Jesus Christ Superstar.

== Costume and Set Design ==
Keogh designed the set and costumes for Le Portrait de Don Quichotte, choreographed by Aurel Miloss in 1947 for Les Ballets des Champs-Élysées (see French Wikipedia) and starring Jean Babilée in the title role. In the fertile post-war environment, the Ballet des Champs-Élysées company was a short lived crucible of cutting-edge, modernist work of the highest quality, ambition and energy, completely independent of the traditionalist Ballet de l'Opera (and distinct from an eponymous company subsequently set up by Roland Petit). At the Ballets des Champs-Elysées, Keogh was designing alongside Christian Bérard, Cecil Beaton and Christian Dior, and stories for new ballets were often written by Jean Cocteau. The artistic director was Boris Kochno and the company was built by Roland Petit. In 1950 Tom Keogh designed Till Eulenspiegel at the Ballets des Champs-Élysées, choreographed by and starring Jean Babilée.

Keogh's costume sketches are signed with a bold black hand, often in the top left hand corner. Moving from stage to screen, Keogh was responsible for the costumes for Marlene Dietrich when she starred with Ronald Colman in the 1944 Metro-Goldwyn-Mayer film production of Kismet, and designed Mae West's costumes for the Broadway production of Catherine was Great. In 1947, he also designed the film costumes for Judy Garland, Gene Kelly, and Gladys Cooper in The Pirate at MGM.

In 1955 Leslie Caron, with whom he had worked previously at the Ballet Des Champs Elysees in Paris, recommended him to design the costumes for the ballet sequences in the 20th Century-Fox musical Daddy Long Legs, which he did. In 1957, also on Caron's recommendation, Keogh designed costumes for a production of Tennessee Williams's "Camino Real" directed by her husband Peter Hall at the Phoenix Theatre, London. More recently, he designed the Berlin production of Jesus Christ Superstar.

== Marriage and private life ==
On 8 June 1945 Keogh married Theodora Roosevelt (b. 1919), the daughter of Lt. Col. Archibald B. Roosevelt and a granddaughter of the late President Theodore Roosevelt. They did not have children and his marriage terminated in divorce. He had an affair with Marie-Laure de Noailles, society hostess, patron of the arts and close friend of Jean Cocteau. His wife Theodora responded by having an affair with her chauffeur. There are also references, in his wife's biography, of his affair with Nathalie Philippart, the dancer wife of Jean Babilée. The affair produced a son, Yann. He is now an actor working in French film and TV under the name of Yann Babilée Keogh. His daughter Lou Gutmann Keogh is a director of photography working in the French film industry.

Tom Keogh features heavily in the book "Masters of Fashion Illustration" by David Downton and is considered by many to be on a par with artists such as Marcel Vertès and Christian Bérard - but possibly due to his alleged alcoholism and uncertain private life he has been somewhat neglected by history.

== Film ==
- 1944 Kismet (MGM) with Marlene Dietrich and Ronald Colman, directed by William Dieterle.
- 1948 The Pirate (MGM) with Judy Garland and Gene Kelly, directed by Vincente Minnelli.
- 1955 Daddy Long Legs (20th Century-Fox) with Leslie Caron and Fred Astaire, directed by Jean Negulesco.

Tom Keogh died in Mount Sinai Hospital in New York after a long illness on 15 February 1980.
