= Archibald Roosevelt =

United States Army officer (1894–1979)

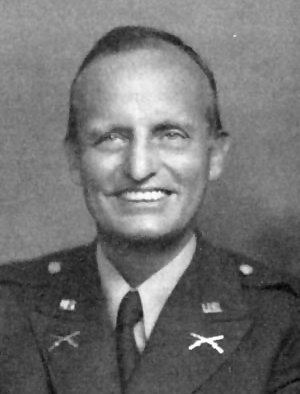
- Roosevelt during WWII as a Lieutenant Colonel
- Born: Archibald Bulloch Roosevelt; April 9, 1894; Washington, D.C., U.S.
- Died: October 13, 1979 (aged 85); Stuart, Florida, U.S.
- Burial place: Youngs Memorial Cemetery; Oyster Bay Cove, New York, U.S.
- Education: Harvard University
- Spouse: Grace Lockwood
- Children: 4, including Archibald Jr. and Theodora
- Relatives: Roosevelt family
- Military career
- Allegiance: United States
- Branch: United States Army
- Service years: 1917–1919, 1943–1944
- Rank: Lieutenant colonel
- Commands: 3rd Battalion, 162nd Infantry Regiment
- Conflicts: World War I World War II: Battle of Roosevelt Ridge
- Awards: Silver Star (4); Bronze Star; Purple Heart (2); Croix de Guerre

Archibald Bulloch Roosevelt Sr. (April 9, 1894 – October 13, 1979) was a U.S. Army officer and commander of U.S. forces in both world wars, and the fifth child of U.S. President Theodore Roosevelt. In both conflicts he was wounded. He earned the Silver Star with three oak leaf clusters, Purple Heart with oak leaf cluster, and the French Croix de Guerre. After World War II, he became a businessman and the founder of a New York City bond brokerage house, as well as a spokesman for conservative political causes.

== Early life and family ==
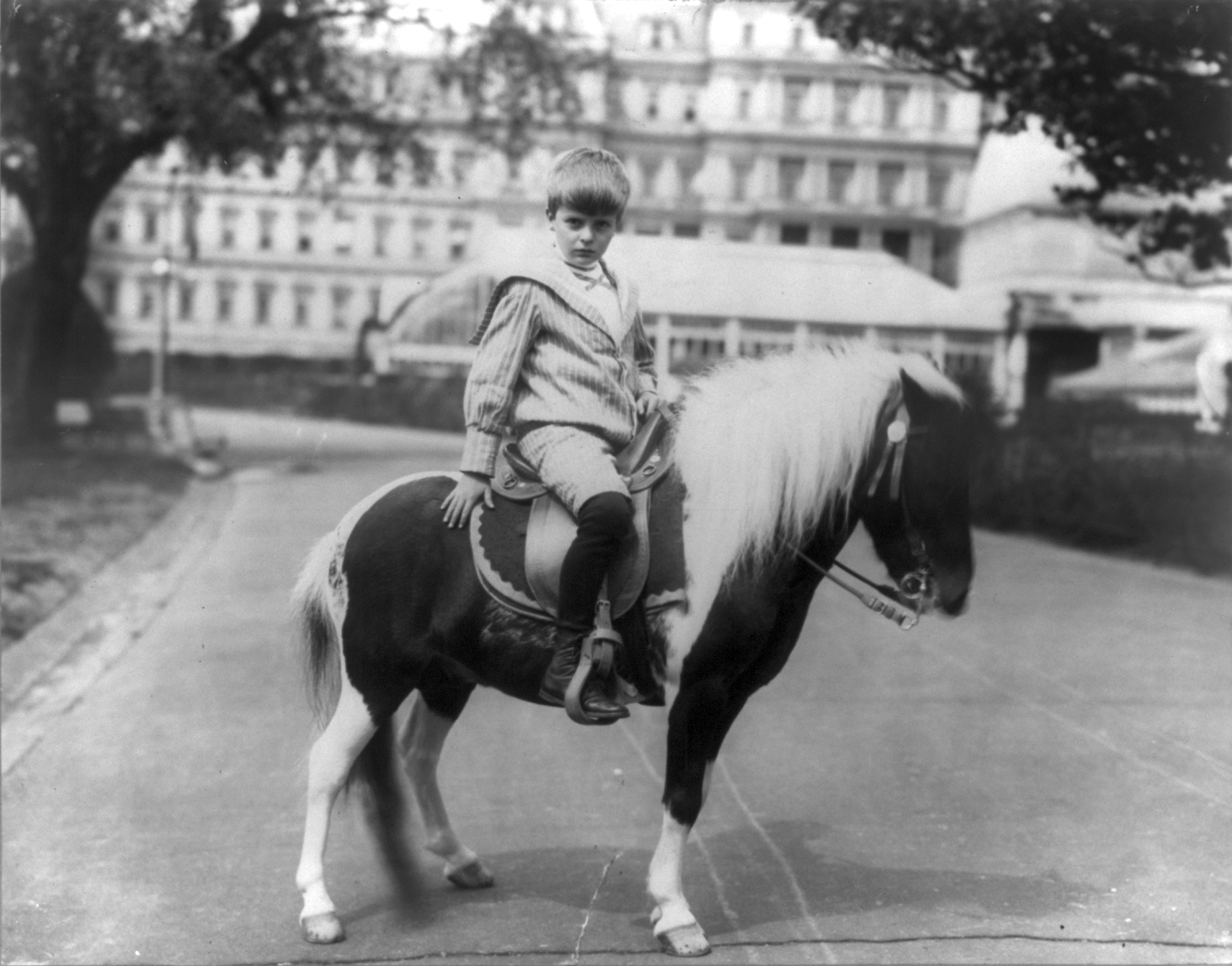
Archie poses with his pony Algonquin in 1902

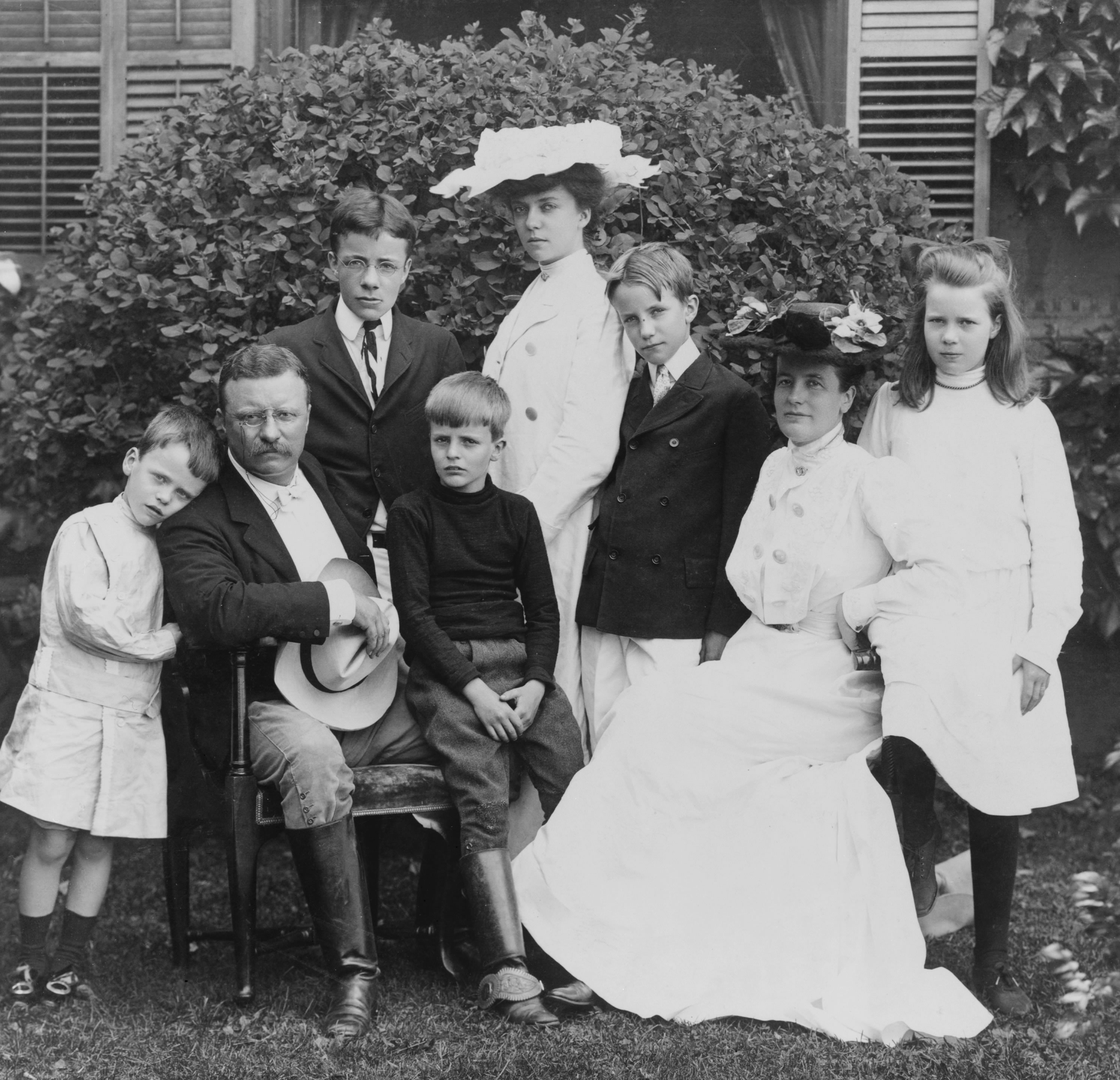
Roosevelt Family in 1903 with Quentin on the left, TR, Ted, Archie, Alice, Kermit, Edith, and Ethel

Archie was born in Washington, D.C., the fourth child of President Theodore "T. R." Roosevelt Jr. and Edith Kermit Carow. He had three brothers, Ted (Theodore III), Kermit, and Quentin, a sister Ethel, and a half-sister Alice. Archie was named for his maternal great-great-great-grandfather Archibald Bulloch, a patriot of the American Revolution.

His first cousin was Eleanor Roosevelt and his fifth cousin, once removed was Franklin D. Roosevelt. He was uncle to Kermit Roosevelt Jr., Joseph Willard Roosevelt, Dirck Roosevelt, Belle Wyatt "Clochette" Roosevelt, Grace Green Roosevelt, Theodore Roosevelt III, Cornelius V.S. Roosevelt, and Quentin Roosevelt II. His sister-in-law was Belle Wyatt Willard Roosevelt, and his grandniece was Susan Roosevelt Weld, the former wife of Massachusetts Governor William F. Weld.

As a child, Archie was very quiet but very mischievous – especially when he was with his brother Quentin; growing up, Archie and Quentin were very close. They rarely left each other's side and had very few fights. But as for the other siblings, Archie was not close to either Kermit or Ethel, because they would gang up on him. Ted would help beat up Kermit for him and would also tell their mother, Edith, about Ethel, who would often get in trouble. Alice was ten years older than Archie, and he barely remembered her being around, since she would often go places with other family members and friends. Archie was an avid reader and very good at putting puzzles together quickly. His father remarked to him, "Archie, my smart boy, never give up your smartness; that goes for you and your brother Quentin."

Archie first attended the Force School and Sidwell Friends School. After being expelled from Groton, Archie continued his education at the Evans School for Boys, and graduated from Phillips Academy, Andover, Massachusetts, in 1913. He went on to Harvard University, where he graduated in 1917.

== Military career ==
=== World War I and years later ===
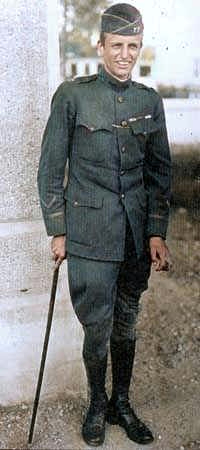
Captain Roosevelt, in 1919, recovering from wounds received during World War I

Archie volunteered for the United States Army during 1917, shipped over to France, and was wounded while serving with the U.S. 1st Infantry Division. His wounds were so severe he was discharged from the Army with full disability. He had ended the war as an Army captain. For his valor, Archie received two Silver Star Citations (later converted to the Silver Star medal when it was established in 1932) and the French government's Croix de Guerre.

After the death of his father in 1919, he sent a telegram informing all his siblings that "the old lion is dead".

After the end of the war, he worked for a time as an executive with the Sinclair Consolidated Oil Company, as vice president of the Union Petroleum Company, the export auxiliary subsidiary of Sinclair Consolidated. At the same time his eldest brother Ted was Assistant Secretary of the Navy. In 1922, Albert B. Fall, U.S. Secretary of the Interior, leased, without competitive bidding, the Teapot Dome Field to Harry F. Sinclair of Sinclair Oil, and the field at Elk Hills, California, to Edward L. Doheny of Pan American Petroleum & Transport Company, both fields part of the Navy's petroleum reserves. The connection between the Roosevelt brothers could not be ignored. After Sinclair sailed for Europe to avoid testifying, G. D. Wahlberg, Sinclair's private secretary, advised Archibald Roosevelt to resign to save his reputation. Eventually, after resigning from Sinclair, Roosevelt gave key testimony to the Senate Committee on Public Lands probing the Teapot Dome scandal, in which Roosevelt was not implicated, but where Sinclair and Doheny both gave "personal loans" to Secretary Fall. Following this, Roosevelt took a job working for a cousin in the family investment firm, Roosevelt & Son.

In the summer of 1932, Archie, former President Calvin Coolidge, former Solicitor General William Marshall Bullitt, Admiral Richard E. Byrd, and General James Harbord, among others, formed a conservative pressure group known as the National Economy League, which called for balancing the federal budget by cutting appropriations for veterans in half.

=== World War II: The Battle for Roosevelt Ridge in New Guinea ===
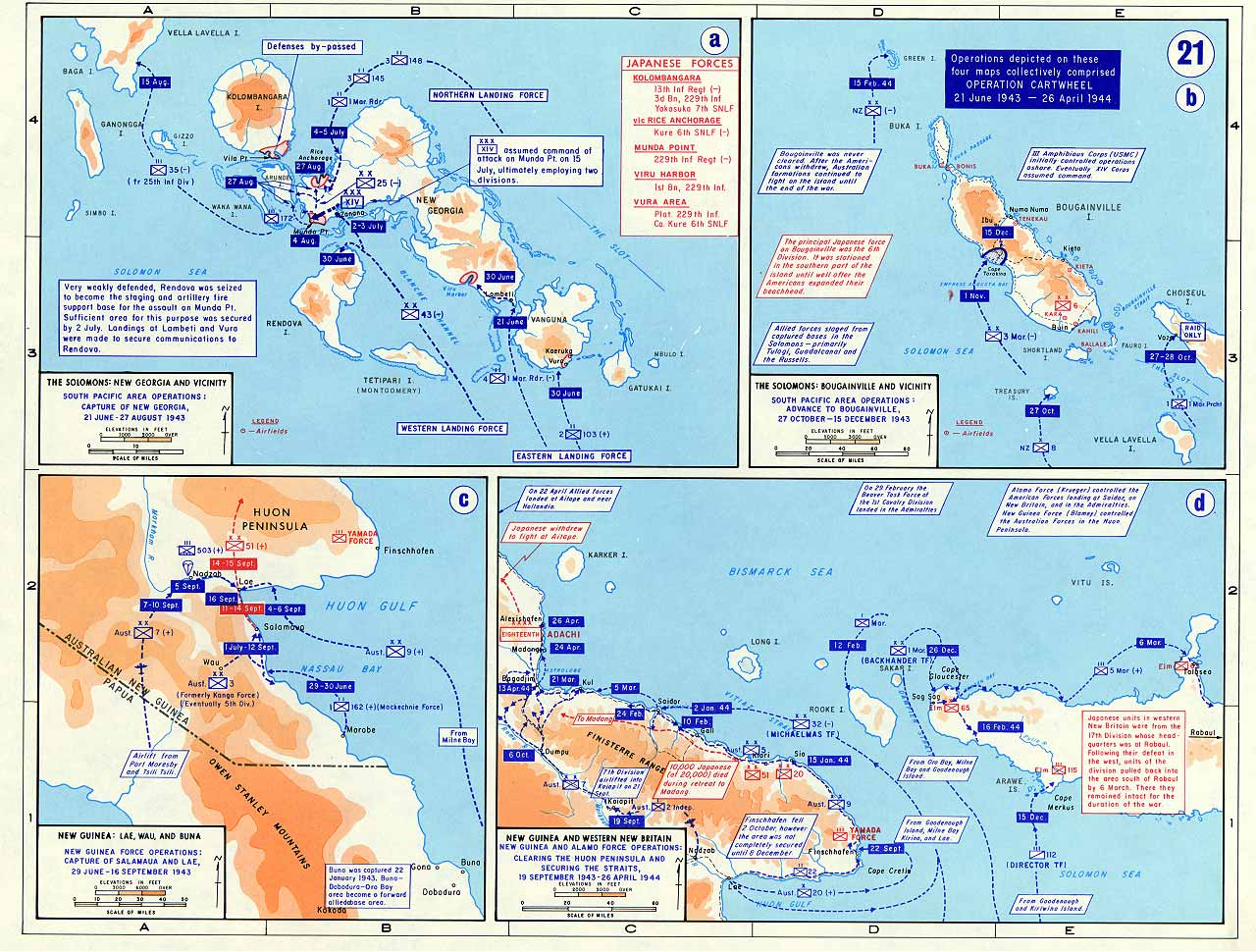
War in the Pacific – New Guinea Campaign's "Operation Cartwheel"

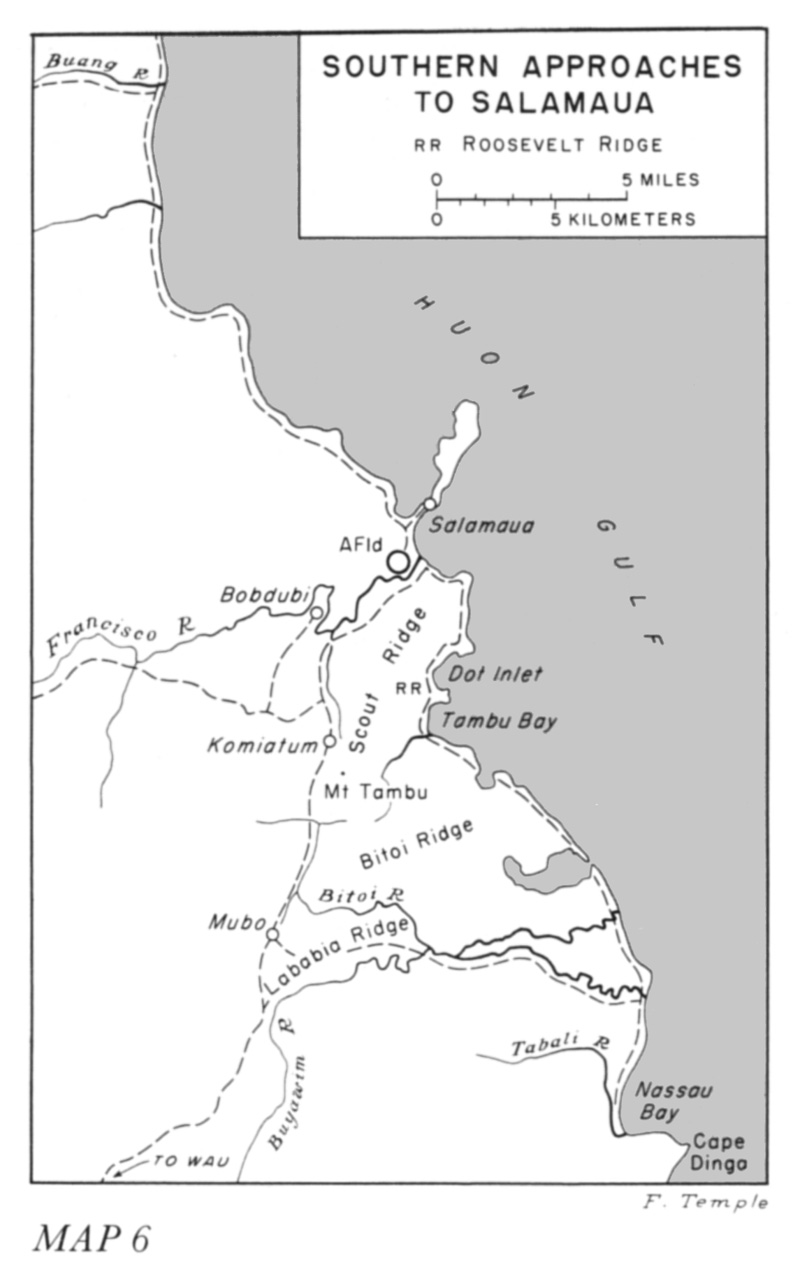
Roosevelt Ridge "RR" from US Army History

After United States' entry into World War II on the side of the Allies following the Japanese Attack on Pearl Harbor, Roosevelt petitioned President Franklin D. Roosevelt to put his battlefield-honed leadership skills to worthwhile use for the American war effort. The president approved his request and he rejoined the Army with a commission as a Major. Roosevelt was given command in early 1943 of the US Army's 3rd Battalion, 162nd Infantry Regiment also called the 162 Regimental Combat Team, (RCT), 41st Infantry Division in New Guinea commanding this unit until early 1944. Working with the Australian 3rd Division, Roosevelt and his battalion landed in New Guinea's Nassau Bay, on July 8, 1943.

Overcoming significant command ambiguities between American and Australian forces because of overlapping spheres of operation, Roosevelt played an important role in the Salamaua campaign. His service was recognized when one of the hotly contested ridge-lines northwest of the island's Tambu Bay was named in his honor. This piece of key terrain during the campaign was originally referred to as "Roosevelt's Ridge" to mark the ridge nearest his battalion to higher HQ. Later, it was referred to as "Roosevelt Ridge" as it was depicted in the official American and Australian campaign histories as well as the US Army Air Force World War II Chronology. See left map.

On August 12, 1943, Roosevelt was wounded by an enemy grenade, which shattered the same knee that had been injured in World War I, and for which he had been earlier medically retired, earning him the distinction of being the only American to ever be classified as 100% disabled twice for the same wound incurred in two different wars. At the time of his injury, command of his battalion passed to his executive officer, Major Taylor. Archie returned to his unit in early 1944. For these actions in the Pacific Theater of Operations, Roosevelt was awarded his second and third oak leaf clusters to the Silver Star in lieu of additional awards.

With the war's conclusion, Archibald Roosevelt was the only son of Theodore and Edith Roosevelt to survive both World Wars; his older brothers Theodore Jr. and Kermit died of a heart attack in 1944 and committed suicide in 1943 respectively outside of combat in World War II, and his younger brother Quentin was shot down in 1918 during World War I.

=== Military awards ===
- Silver Star with three oak leaf clusters
- Bronze Star Medal
- Purple Heart with oak leaf cluster
- World War I Victory Medal
- Army of Occupation of Germany Medal
- American Defense Service Medal
- American Campaign Medal
- Asiatic-Pacific Campaign Medal with one campaign star
- World War Two Victory Medal
- Army of Occupation Medal
- French Croix de Guerre 1914–1918

== Later career ==
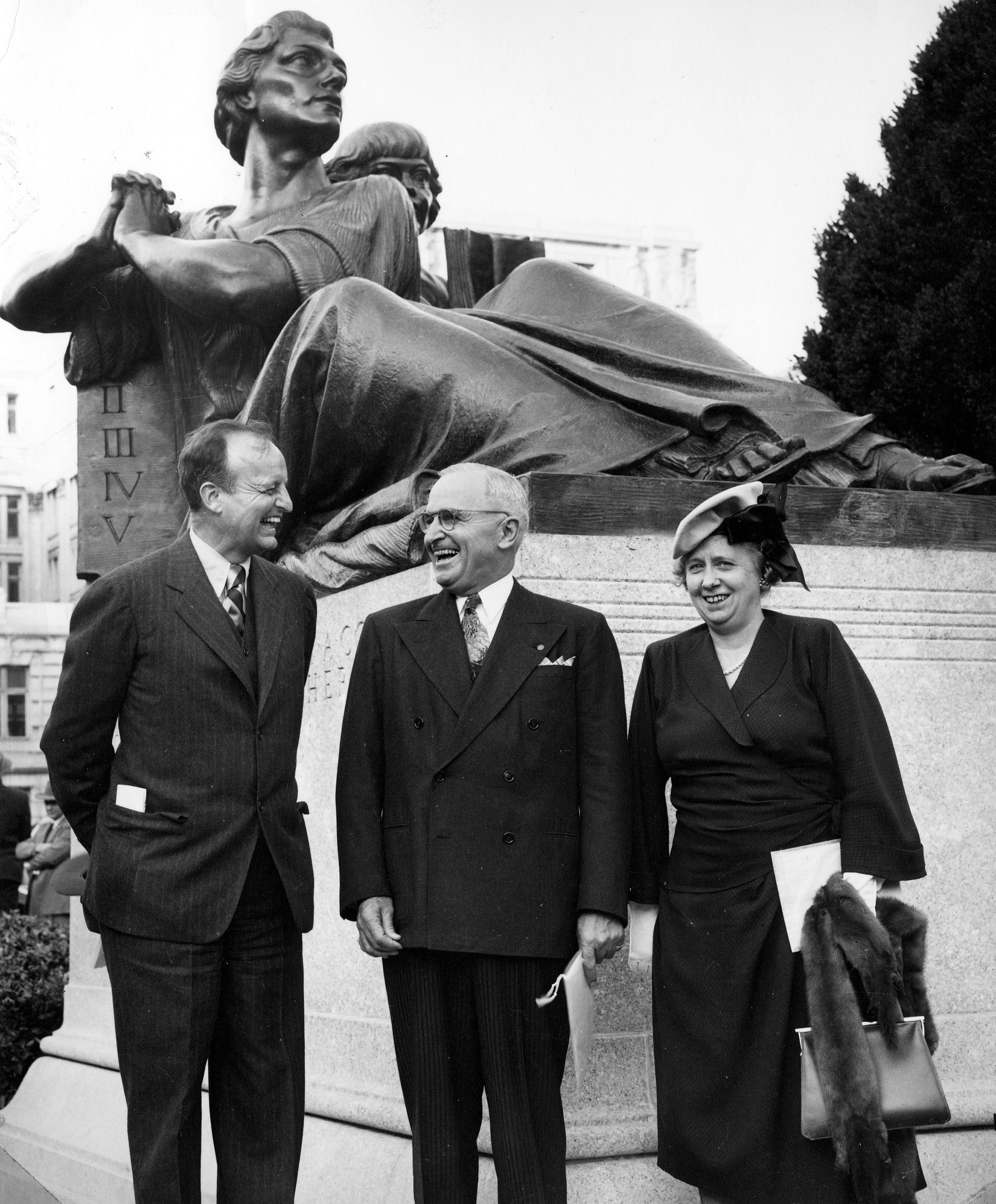
Roosevelt with President Truman and Bess Truman, 1947

=== Entrepreneurship in the Investment Sector ===
Following the end of the war, Archie Roosevelt formed the investment firm of Roosevelt and Cross, a brokerage house specializing in municipal bonds. It is still a going concern with offices in New York City, Providence, Buffalo and Hartford.

=== Activism and controversies ===
During the early 1950s, Archie became affiliated with a variety of right-wing organizations and causes. He joined the John Birch Society and was the founder of the Veritas Foundation, which was dedicated to rooting out presumed socialist influences at Harvard and other major colleges and universities. Writing in the book America's Political Dynasties (Doubleday, 1966), Stephen Hess commented: "Archie Roosevelt has, in recent years, added the family's name to many ultra-rightist causes. As a trustee of the Veritas Foundation he was a leader among those seeking to root out subversion at Harvard. He also sent a letter to every U.S. Senator, stating 'modern technical civilization does not seem to be as well-handled by the black man as by the white man in the United States.' Present civil rights difficulties he blamed on 'socialist plotters.'" Roosevelt also compiled 1968's incendiary Theodore Roosevelt On Race, Riots, Reds, Crime. He was also the chief sponsor behind "The Alliance," a short-lived organization of the 1950s.

In 1953 he joined the Empire State Society of the Sons of the American Revolution of which both his father and elder brother had been members.

In 1954, when the Theodore Roosevelt Association made a decision to award the Theodore Roosevelt Medal for Distinguished Public Service to black diplomat Ralph Bunche, Archie loudly protested the award. He even went so far as to write and publish a 44-page pamphlet that attempted to prove Bunche had been working as an agent of the "International Communist Conspiracy" for more than two decades.

=== The Alliance, Inc. ===
Archie additionally served as president for an organization named The Alliance, Inc., where Zygmund Dobbs was Research Director. The Alliance published books by Dobbs such as Red Intrigue and Race Turmoil (New York: The Alliance, Inc., 1958), for which Archie wrote forewords. In the foreword to The Great Deceit: Social Pseudo-Sciences, Archie wrote: "Socialists have infiltrated our schools, our law courts, our government, our MEDIA OF COMMUNICATIONS.... the Socialist movement is made up of a relatively small number of people who have developed the TECHNIQUE OF INFLUENCING large masses of people to a VERY HIGH DEGREE." Johnson's book, Color, Communism, and Common Sense, was quoted by G. Edward Griffin in his 1969 motion picture lecture More Deadly than War ... the Communist Revolution in America. In 1958, as president of The Alliance, Inc., Roosevelt wrote the preface for Manning Johnson's semi-memoir, semi-polemical tract Color, Communism, and Common Sense.

== Personal life ==
Archie married Grace Lockwood, daughter of Thomas Lockwood and Emmeline Stackpole, at the Emmanuel Church in Boston, Massachusetts, on April 14, 1917. The couple spent most of their married life in a pre-Revolutionary house on Turkey Lane in Cold Spring Harbor, New York, not far from Oyster Bay, where they had four children:

- Archibald Bulloch Roosevelt Jr. (1918–1990), who married Katharine W. Tweed, daughter of Harrison Tweed, and later Selwa "Lucky" Showker Roosevelt (b. 1929)
- Theodora Roosevelt (1919–2008), who became a dancer and novelist under the name Theodora Keogh
- Nancy Dabney Roosevelt (1923–2010)
- Edith Kermit Roosevelt (1927–2003), a Barnard College graduate, married 1948–1952 to Alexander Gregory Barmine; parents of Margot Roosevelt

In 1971, Archie's wife, Grace Lockwood Roosevelt, died in an automobile crash near her home on Turkey Lane in Cold Spring Harbor, with her husband at the wheel.

On October 13, 1979, Roosevelt died of a stroke at the Stuart Convalescent Home in Stuart, Florida. He was 85 years old, the last child of Theodore and Edith to die (although his half-sister Alice would outlive him by four months). He is buried with his wife at Youngs Memorial Cemetery, Oyster Bay. His tombstone reads: "The old fighting man home from the wars."

=== Descendants ===
Roosevelt's grandson is Tweed Roosevelt (b. 1942), who is the chairman of Roosevelt China Investments, and is the President of the Board of Trustees of the Theodore Roosevelt Association.

== Publications ==
- Roosevelt, Theodore. Theodore Roosevelt on Race, Riots, Reds, Crime. Compiled by Archibald B. Roosevelt. West Sayville, New York: Probe Publishers, 1968.
- Zygmund, Dobbs. Red Intrigue and Race Turmoil. Foreword by Archibald B. Roosevelt. New York: The Alliance, Inc., 1954.
- Zygmund, Dobbs. The Great Deceit: Social Pseudo-Sciences. Foreword by Archibald B. Roosevelt. Sayville, NY: Veritas Publishing, 1964.
