= National First Ladies Day =

American holiday

First Ladies Day
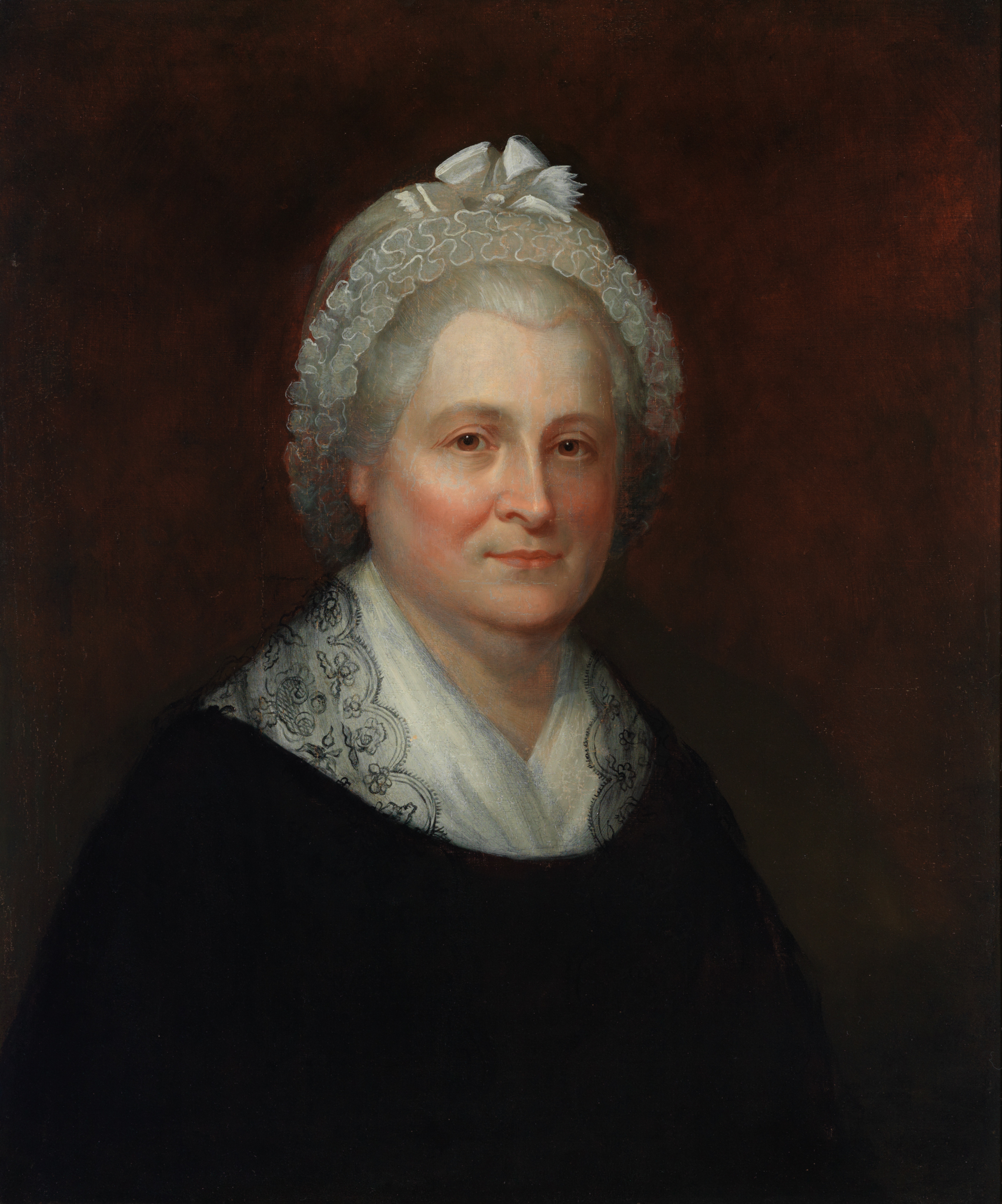
- Martha Dandridge Custis Washington, the first woman to serve as First Lady of the United States
- Official name: National First Ladies Day
- Observed by: United States
- Celebrations: Community and national celebrations
- Date: Last Saturday in April
- Frequency: Annual
- First time: 2021
- Related to: First inauguration of George Washington

National First Ladies Day, more simply known as First Ladies Day, is an American observance that celebrates the women who have served as First Ladies of the United States. It is observed annually on the last Saturday in April to coincide with the anniversary of the first inauguration of George Washington, at which time Martha Washington became the nation's inaugural First Lady.

== History ==
The National First Ladies Day Commission was founded in 2021 by Rev. Nicholas W. Inman, in collaboration with the Society of Presidential Descendants, to create a national day of service in honor of women who served as first ladies of the United States and to recognize their contributions to American history, culture, and civic life. Charter members of the commission were Nicholas W. Inman, Mary Jean Eisenhower, Massee McKinley, Ulysses Grant Dietz, Jennifer Coolidge Sayles Harville, Andrew Och, James Earl Carter IV, Jennie Highfield, Andy Person, Patricia Taft, and Clifton Truman Daniel. Eisenhower and McKinley were elected to serve as co-chairs of the commission and Highfield was appointed as the commission's secretary. Larry Cook, Margaret Hayes Clark, James A. Garfield III, Patty Dowd Schmitz, Andrew Greer, and Reagan Inman were later appointed to the commission.

On March 30, 2022, the National Day Calendar officially designated the last Saturday in April as National First Ladies Day, aligned with President George Washington's first inauguration on April 30, 1789 to commemorate the beginning of the first lady's role with Martha Washington. The public announcement of National First Ladies Day was made during the annual First Ladies Tea at the Missouri Cherry Blossom Festival in April 2022 by Andrew Och. Former First Lady Rosalynn Carter sent a letter offering support to the commission and acknowledgement of the holiday that was read aloud during the festival. The letter was donated to the First Ladies National Historic Site in Canton, Ohio.

The national kickoff ceremony for National First Ladies Day took place on April 30, 2023 at Marshfield High School in Marshfield, Missouri, during the 2023 Missouri Cherry Blossom Festival.

In 2024, the holiday was celebrated on April 27.

In June 2025, the commission invited sitting President Generals of the Daughters of the American Revolution to serve on the board of trustees, with Pamela Rouse Wright becoming the first president general to serve in this capacity. Ginnie Sebastian Storage joined the commission's board of trustees upon her election as president general later that month.

== Observance ==
National First Ladies Day is observed as a day of public service and volunteering. Schools, civic groups, museums, and community organizations observe the holiday by hosting events, service projects, and educational programs. Celebrants have made social media posts using the hashtag "#FirstLadiesDay". Observances also include attending tea parties and writing letters to living past and present ladies.

== See also ==
- Presidents' Day
- Society of Presidential Descendants
