= Archibald Roosevelt Jr. =

American soldier, scholar, polyglot and CIA officer (1918–1990)

- Born: Archibald Bulloch Roosevelt Jr. February 18, 1918; Boston, Massachusetts
- Died: May 31, 1990 (aged 72)
- Occupations: soldier; scholar; polyglot; CIA officer
- Spouses: Katharine W. Tweed (m. 1940–1950) Selwa Showker (m. 1950)
- Children: Tweed Roosevelt
- Parent(s): Archibald Roosevelt; Grace Lockwood
- Family: Roosevelt family

Archibald Bulloch Roosevelt Jr. (February 18, 1918 – May 31, 1990), a grandson of U.S. President Theodore Roosevelt, was a soldier, scholar, polyglot, authority on the Middle East, and career CIA officer. He served as chief of the Central Intelligence Agency's stations in Istanbul, Madrid and London. Roosevelt had a speaking or reading knowledge of at least twenty languages.

== Early life ==
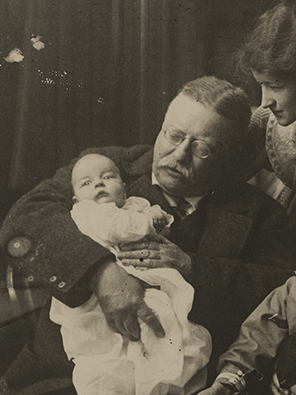
Archibald Bulloch Roosevelt, Jr. held by Theodore Roosevelt and the baby's mother Grace Stackpole Lockwood Roosevelt (right) at Sagamore Hill in 1918

Archibald Bulloch Roosevelt Jr. was born in Boston, Massachusetts, on February 18, 1918, the son of Grace Lockwood and Archibald Bulloch Roosevelt. He graduated from the Groton School and then went to Harvard University, where he graduated in the class of 1940. He was selected as a Rhodes Scholar as an undergraduate, but he was not able to accept the post due to the outbreak of World War II in Europe. Roosevelt first worked for a newspaper in Seattle, Washington.

== World War II ==
During the war, he became an Army intelligence officer. He served as a "Ritchie Boy" secret unit specially trained at Fort Ritchie, Maryland. He accompanied U.S. troops in their landing in North Africa in 1942 and soon began to form views on the French colonial administration and the beginnings of Arab nationalism. Later in the war he was a military attaché in Iraq and Iran.

== Post-war work in the CIA ==
In 1947, Roosevelt joined the Central Intelligence Group, the immediate forerunner of the CIA. From 1947 to 1949, he served in Beirut. On that and on all of his subsequent assignments abroad, he was listed in official registers as a State Department official.

From 1949 to 1951, he was in New York as head of the Near East section of the Voice of America. From 1951 to 1953, he was station chief in Istanbul. From 1953 to 1958, he had several jobs at CIA headquarters in Washington, D.C. In 1958, he was made CIA station chief in Spain. From 1962 to 1966 he held the same job in London. He finished his CIA career in Washington, D.C., where he retired in 1974. Roosevelt was involved in coup plots in Syria and Iraq, but he was unable to replicate his cousin Kim's success in Iran.

=== Operation Straggle, 1956 ===
Roosevelt met with National Security Council member Wilbur Crane Eveland and former Syrian minister Michail Bey Ilyan in Damascus on 1 July 1956 to discuss a US-backed 'anticommunist' takeover of Syria. They made a plan, scheduled for enactment on 25 October 1956, in which the military would

take control of Damascus, Aleppo, Homs, and Hamah. The frontier posts with Jordan, Iraq, and Lebanon would also be captured in order to seal Syria's borders until the radio stations announced that a new government had taken over under Colonel Kabbani, who would place armored units at key positions throughout Damascus. Once control had been established, Ilyan would inform the civilians he'd selected that they were to form a new government, but in order to avoid leaks none of them would be told until just a week before the coup.

The CIA backed this plan (known as "Operation Straggle") with 500,000 Syrian pounds (worth about $167,000) and the promise to support the new government. Although Secretary of State John Foster Dulles publicly opposed a coup, privately he had consulted with the CIA and recommended the plan to President Eisenhower.

The plan was postponed for five days, during which time Israel invaded Egypt. Ilyan told Eveland he could not succeed in overthrowing the Syrian government during a war of Israeli aggression. On 31 October, John Foster Dulles informed his brother Allen Dulles, the Director of the CIA: "Re Straggle our people feel that conditions are such that it would be a mistake to try to pull it off". Eveland speculated that this coincidence had been engineered by the British in order to defuse US criticism of the invasion of Egypt.

=== Iraq ===
In mid-1962, the Kennedy administration tasked Roosevelt with making preparations for a military coup against Iraqi Prime Minister Abd al-Karim Qasim, whose expropriation of the concessionary holdings of the British- and American-owned Iraq Petroleum Company and threats to invade Kuwait were considered a threat to U.S. interests in the Persian Gulf. While the CIA had cultivated assets within the Iraqi Ba'ath Party, a former CIA colleague of Roosevelt's has denied any CIA role in the February 1963 Ba'athist coup that saw Qasim assassinated, stating instead that the CIA's efforts against Qasim were still in the planning stages at the time.

== Post-CIA retirement ==
After retiring from the CIA in 1974, Roosevelt became a vice president of Chase Manhattan Bank, and a director of international relations in its Washington office. In this position, he became an associate of the bank's chairman, David Rockefeller and accompanied him as an adviser on his regular travels to Middle Eastern countries.

Well known in Washington social circles in his own right, he was particularly active on the diplomatic circuit during the Reagan administration, when his wife, Selwa Showker "Lucky" Roosevelt, was the chief of protocol with the rank of ambassador from 1982 to 1989.

In 1988, Roosevelt published a memoir called For Lust of Knowing: Memoirs of an Intelligence Officer, where he mentions his wartime service as an Army intelligence officer in Morocco, Iraq and Iran. He is much more circumspect in describing his time with the CIA, adhering so strictly to his oath to keep the CIA's secrets that he did not even identify the countries where he had served. And although he was happy to tell interviewers that they could figure it out from his entry in Who's Who in America, he also was quick to explain that some Americans have forgotten what an oath is and that he would not break his even if the government told him to. Even still, evidence shows there was concern within the US government about the public knowledge of the contents of his book. President Ronald Reagan states in his diary that he was advised against holding a public White House reception for Roosevelt, so as to not promote his book. He does not state who specifically advised him on this matter.

Throughout Roosevelt's life, he pursued an interest in languages. A Latin and Greek scholar when he was a boy, he had a speaking or reading knowledge of perhaps 20 languages, including French, Spanish, German, Russian, Arabic, Hebrew, Swahili, and Uzbek.

== Marriage and family ==
Roosevelt married the former Katharine W. Tweed (the daughter of Harrison Tweed) in 1940 and they had one son, Tweed Roosevelt born in 1942. That marriage ended in divorce in 1950. Roosevelt later married Selwa "Lucky" Showker Roosevelt, who was the chief of protocol with the rank of ambassador from 1982 to 1989. They were married for 40 years.

== Death and burial ==
Roosevelt died on May 31, 1990, of congestive heart failure. He is buried in the Roosevelt family plot at Youngs Memorial Cemetery, Oyster Bay, New York.

== See also ==
- Archibald Roosevelt
- Theodore Roosevelt
- Tweed Roosevelt
