= Grandview C-4 School District =

School district in Missouri, U.S.

Address
- 13015 10th Street Grandview, Missouri, 64030; United States

District information
- Type: Public
- Grades: PreK–12
- NCES District ID: 2913140

Students and staff
- Students: 3,750
- Teachers: 273.03
- Staff: 246.59
- Student–teacher ratio: 13.73

Other information
- Website: grandviewc4.net

Grandview Consolidated School District #4 (GC-4), also Grandview C-4 School District is a school district headquartered in Grandview, Missouri. The district serves most of Grandview and portions of southern Kansas City and Lee's Summit. As of 2019 it had over 600 employees with over 330 teachers, over 260 classified employees, and about 30 administrators; and about 4,300 students.

The district was established in 1914.

== Schools ==
High school:

- Grandview High School (GHS)

K-8:

- Martin City K-8 Schools

Middle schools:

- Grandview Middle School (GMS)

Elementary schools:

- Belvidere Elementary School
- Butcher-Greene Elementary School
- Conn-West Elementary School
- Meadowmere Elementary School

Preschool:

- High Grove

Alternative:

- Center for Alternative Instructional Resources (CAIR)

== Notable alumni ==
- Freedom Akinmoladun (born 1996), professional football player for the Michigan Panthers
