= Martha Young Truman =

Mother of United States president Harry S. Truman (1852-1947)

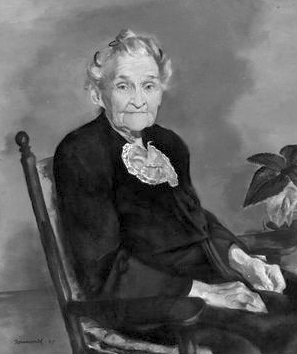
- Truman in 1945
- Born: Martha Ellen Young; November 25, 1852; Jackson County, Missouri, U.S.
- Died: July 26, 1947 (aged 94); Grandview, Missouri, U.S.
- Known for: Mother of U.S. president Harry Truman
- Spouse: John Anderson Truman (m. 1881; died 1914)
- Children: 4, including Harry
- Parent(s): Solomon Young; Harriet Louisa Gregg
- Relatives: Margaret Truman (granddaughter); Clifton Truman Daniel (great-grandson)

Martha Ellen Young Truman (November 25, 1852 – July 26, 1947) was the mother of U.S. president Harry Truman, the paternal grandmother of Margaret Truman, a maternal great-grandmother of Clifton Truman Daniel, and the mother-in-law of Bess Truman.

== Biography ==
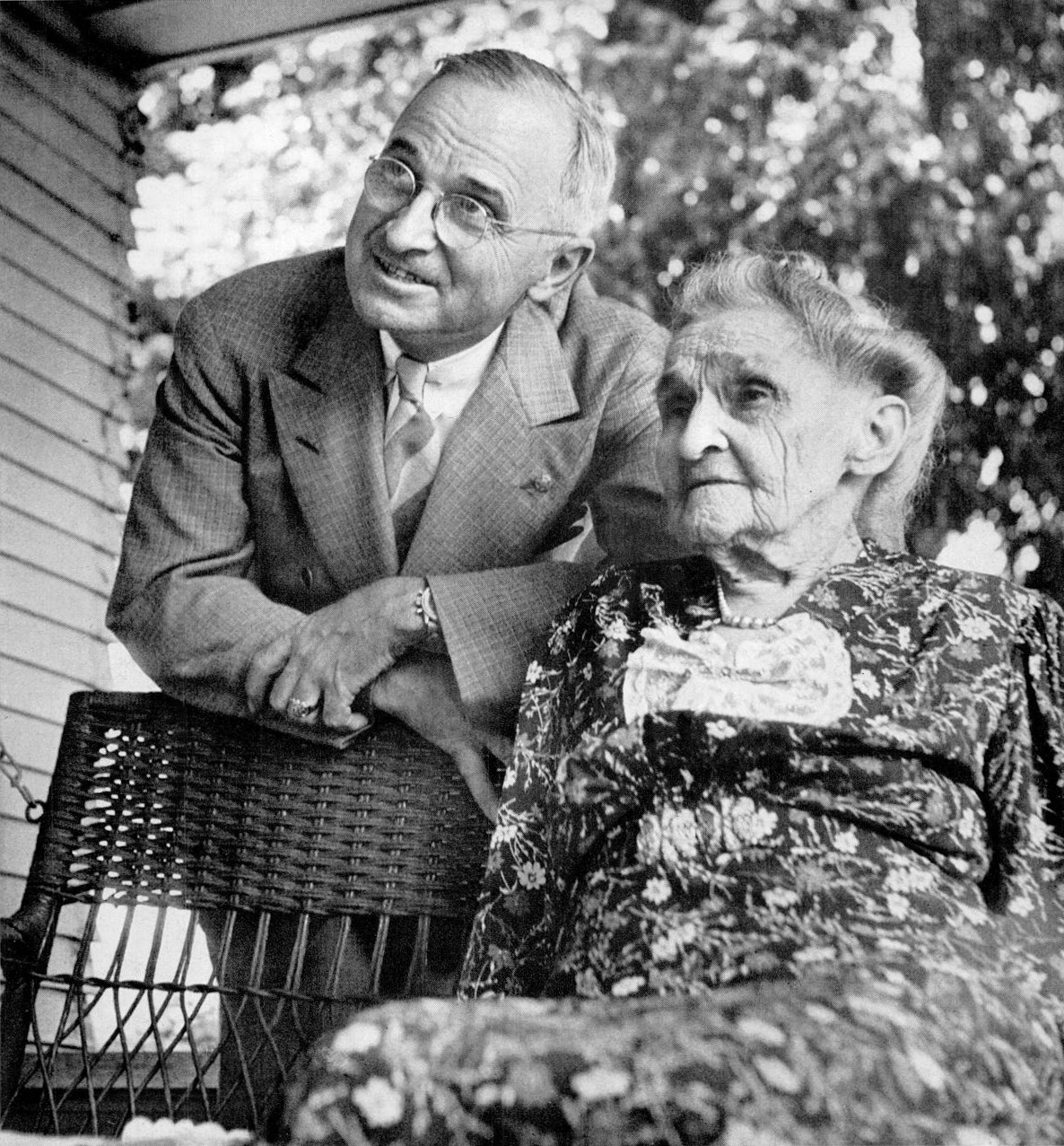
Sen. Harry S. Truman visits his mother in Grandview, Missouri, after being nominated the Democratic candidate for vice president (July 1944)

Martha Ellen Young was born on Parrish Place farm outside of Kansas City, Jackson County, Missouri, on November 25, 1852, to Solomon Young, a successful farmer who also had a business running Conestoga wagon trains along the Overland Trail, and his wife Harriet Louisa Gregg. She was one of nine children and was a Baptist.

In the American Civil War, the family were southern sympathizers and several relatives served in the Confederate States Army. In later life, Martha told of how a band of Union-supporting Jayhawkers took all of the animals and silver from her farm in 1861, whilst she hid under the kitchen table. She told that they came again in 1863 when the family was forced to evacuate by General Order 11 and required to move to Platte County, Missouri until after the war. This harsh treatment left Martha with a lifelong resentment for the winning Union side in the war. She was well known for her Confederate sympathies (a story made the rounds that when she first visited the White House in 1945, she refused to sleep in the Lincoln Bedroom, but her family denied this account). When Harry joined the National Guard and visited his grandmother Harriet in his blue uniform, she said "Harry, that's the first time a uniform of that color has been in this house since the Civil War. Don't you bring it back" and ordered him out of the house.

Martha attended the Baptist College for Women in Lexington, Missouri. She married John Anderson Truman on December 28, 1881 in Grandview, Missouri. The couple settled in Lamar, Missouri, later moving to Independence, Missouri. Their first son died just a few days after birth. Their second child, another son, was Harry S. Truman, born on May 8, 1884. He was named after Martha's brother Harrison "Harry" Young (1846–1916), but the "S" did not stand for a middle name. Two more children followed: John Vivian Truman on April 25, 1886 (who became a district director of the Federal Housing Administration in western Missouri), and Mary Jane Truman on August 12, 1889 (who was a pianist and schoolteacher). All three children worked on the family farm in Grandview.

After her husband John Truman died in 1914, Martha took over the farm and ran it with the labor of her children and various hired helpers until the 1930s, when her age and increasing frailty made it impossible. At the time of her son's selection as vice presidential nominee in 1944, Martha Truman told the press that Truman had not wanted the position and that she would have rather seen him stay in the Senate.

On April 12, 1945, President Roosevelt died and Harry S. Truman was sworn in as president. Martha Truman was often quoted in the press. She made her first trip to Washington soon after Harry became president, for Mother's Day, accompanied by her daughter Mary. Seeing the crowd of press that arrived to cover her visit, she said, "Oh fiddlesticks! If I'd known that, I wouldn't have come." Her comments were widely reported and were said to have "captured the nation's fancy" due to her "unpretentious nature."

She lived to see two years of her son's presidency before her death on July 26, 1947, aged 94.
