= Grandview, Missouri =

City in Jackson County, Missouri, United States

- City
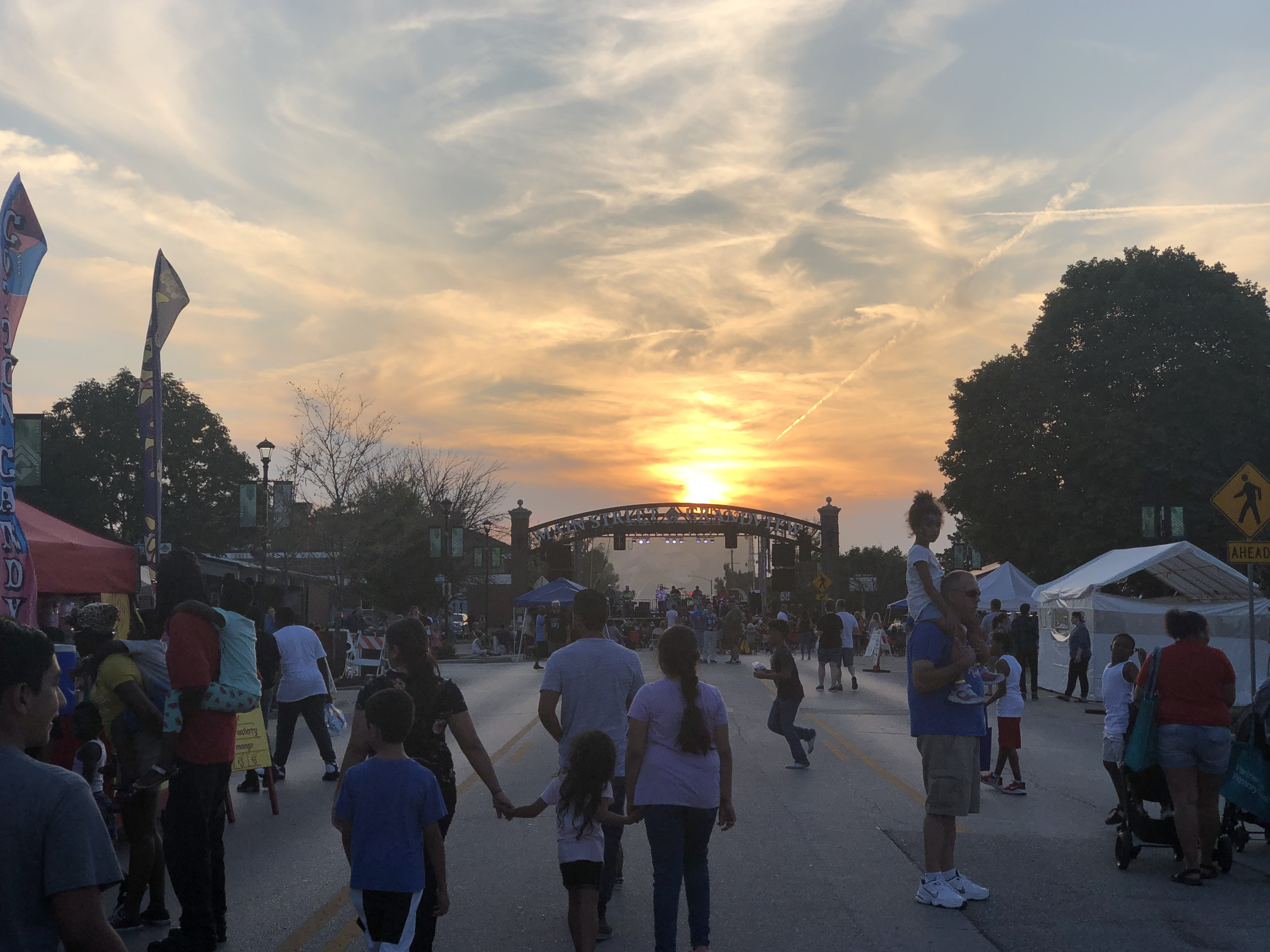
- Sunset over a festival on Grandview's revitalized Main Street.

- Flag
- Nickname: G-View / Dreamview
- Location of Grandview, Missouri
- Coordinates: 38°53′6″N 94°31′21″W
- Country: United States
- State: Missouri
- County: Jackson
- Incorporated: February 6, 1912

Government
  - Mayor: Leonard Jones

Area
  - Total: 14.78 sq mi (38.29 km^{2})
  - Land: 14.73 sq mi (38.15 km^{2})
  - Water: 0.054 sq mi (0.14 km^{2})
- Elevation: 1,050 ft (320 m)

Population (2020)
  - Total: 26,209
  - Density: 1,779.5/sq mi (687.07/km^{2})
- Time zone: UTC−6 (Central (CST))
  - Summer (DST): UTC−5 (CDT)
- ZIP code: 64030
- Area codes: 816, 975
- FIPS code: 29-28324
- GNIS feature ID: 0718686
- Website: www.grandview.org

Grandview is a city in Jackson County, Missouri, United States. The population was 26,209 at the 2020 census. It is part of the Kansas City metropolitan area.

== History ==
A post office called Grandview has been in operation since 1889. The city was named for the view obtained from the elevated town site.

== Geography ==
Grandview is located at 38°53′6″N 94°31′21″W (38.885007, -94.522578), along U.S. Route 71, bordering Kansas City to the south.

According to the United States Census Bureau, the city has a total area of 14.79 square miles (38.31 km^{2}), of which 14.73 square miles (38.15 km^{2}) is land and 0.06 square miles (0.16 km^{2}) is water.

== Demographics ==
Historical population
Census	Pop.	Note	%±
1920	410		—
1930	707		72.4%
1940	596		−15.7%
1950	1,556		161.1%
1960	6,027		287.3%
1970	17,456		189.6%
1980	24,502		40.4%
1990	24,967		1.9%
2000	24,881		−0.3%
2010	24,475		−1.6%
2020	26,209		7.1%
U.S. Decennial Census; 2018 Estimate

=== Racial and ethnic composition ===
Grandview city, Missouri – Racial and ethnic composition Note: the US Census treats Hispanic/Latino as an ethnic category. This table excludes Latinos from the racial categories and assigns them to a separate category. Hispanics/Latinos may be of any race.
Race / Ethnicity (NH = Non-Hispanic)	Pop 2000	Pop 2010	Pop 2020	% 2000	% 2010	% 2020
White alone (NH)	14,435	11,014	10,477	58.02%	45.00%	39.97%
Black or African American alone (NH)	8,295	9,908	9,902	33.34%	40.48%	37.78%
Native American or Alaska Native alone (NH)	119	92	112	0.48%	0.38%	0.43%
Asian alone (NH)	251	258	411	1.01%	1.05%	1.57%
Native Hawaiian or Pacific Islander alone (NH)	20	16	40	0.08%	0.07%	0.15%
Other race alone (NH)	38	32	119	0.15%	0.13%	0.45%
Mixed race or Multiracial (NH)	646	776	1,691	2.60%	3.17%	6.45%
Hispanic or Latino (any race)	1,077	2,379	3,457	4.33%	9.72%	13.19%
Total	24,881	24,475	26,209	100.00%	100.00%	100.00%

=== 2020 census ===
As of the 2020 census, Grandview had a population of 26,209. The median age was 35.2 years. 23.9% of residents were under the age of 18 and 13.8% of residents were 65 years of age or older. For every 100 females there were 90.2 males, and for every 100 females age 18 and over there were 86.8 males age 18 and over.

98.9% of residents lived in urban areas, while 1.1% lived in rural areas.

There were 10,664 households in Grandview, including 5,718 families; 30.5% had children under the age of 18. Of all households, 33.8% were married-couple households, 21.5% were households with a male householder and no spouse or partner present, and 37.0% were households with a female householder and no spouse or partner present. About 32.9% of all households were made up of individuals and 10.1% had someone living alone who was 65 years of age or older. The average household size was 2.4 and the average family size was 3.2.

There were 11,606 housing units, of which 8.1% were vacant. The homeowner vacancy rate was 1.2% and the rental vacancy rate was 7.1%.

Racial composition as of the 2020 census
Race	Number	Percent
White	11,013	42.0%
Black or African American	10,001	38.2%
American Indian and Alaska Native	206	0.8%
Asian	421	1.6%
Native Hawaiian and Other Pacific Islander	42	0.2%
Some other race	1,695	6.5%
Two or more races	2,831	10.8%

=== 2016–2020 American Community Survey ===
The 2016–2020 5-year American Community Survey estimates show that the median household income was $47,670 (with a margin of error of +/- $4,217) and the median family income was $57,476 (+/- $5,898). Males had a median income of $33,718 (+/- $2,408) versus $27,929 (+/- $2,407) for females. The median income for those above 16 years old was $31,198 (+/- $1,870). Approximately, 11.5% of families and 14.8% of the population were below the poverty line, including 22.9% of those under the age of 18 and 8.7% of those ages 65 or over.

=== 2010 census ===
As of the census of 2010, there were 24,475 people, 9,640 households, and 6,137 families living in the city. The population density was 1,661.6 inhabitants per square mile (641.5/km^{2}). There were 11,070 housing units at an average density of 751.5 per square mile (290.2/km^{2}). The racial makeup of the city was 48.4% White (45.0% non-Hispanic white), 40.8% African American, 0.5% Native American, 1.1% Asian, 0.1% Pacific Islander, 5.1% from other races, and 4.0% from two or more races. Hispanic or Latino of any race were 9.7% of the population.

There were 9,640 households, of which 34.9% had children under the age of 18 living with them, 38.6% were married couples living together, 19.2% had a female householder with no husband present, 5.9% had a male householder with no wife present, and 36.3% were non-families. 29.8% of all households were made up of individuals, and 8.2% had someone living alone who was 65 years of age or older. The average household size was 2.52 and the average family size was 3.12.

The median age in the city was 33.7 years. 26.2% of residents were under the age of 18; 10.2% were between the ages of 18 and 24; 27.7% were from 25 to 44; 24.7% were from 45 to 64; and 11.2% were 65 years of age or older. The gender makeup of the city was 47.6% male and 52.4% female.

=== 2000 census ===
As of the census of 2000, there were 24,881 people, 9,709 households, and 6,485 families living in the city. The population density was 1,689.4 inhabitants per square mile (652.3/km^{2}). There were 10,348 housing units at an average density of 702.6 per square mile (271.3/km^{2}). The racial makeup of the city was 59.81% White, 33.54% African American, 0.56% Native American, 1.05% Asian, 0.10% Pacific Islander, 1.93% from other races, and 3.00% from two or more races. Hispanic or Latino of any race were 4.33% of the population.

There were 9,709 households, out of which 33.3% had children under the age of 18 living with them, 46.3% were married couples living together, 15.9% had a female householder with no husband present, and 33.2% were non-families. 27.5% of all households were made up of individuals, and 7.1% had someone living alone who was 65 years of age or older. The average household size was 2.53 and the average family size was 3.08.

In the city, the population was spread out, with 27.2% under the age of 18, 10.0% from 18 to 24, 31.1% from 25 to 44, 22.0% from 45 to 64, and 9.7% who were 65 years of age or older. The median age was 34 years. For every 100 females, there were 93.1 males. For every 100 females age 18 and over, there were 89.7 males.

The median income for a household in the city was $40,003, and the median income for a family was $47,889. Males had a median income of $32,481 versus $26,834 for females. The per capita income for the city was $19,079. About 5.1% of families and 8.4% of the population were below the poverty line, including 11.4% of those under age 18 and 2.4% of those age 65 or over.

== Economy ==
=== Top employers ===
According to the town's 2016 Comprehensive Annual Financial Report, the top employers in the city are:

#	Employer	# of Employees
1	Grandview C-4 School District	584
2	Peterson Manufacturing	539
3	Mead Westvaco Calmar, Inc.	340
4	City of Grandview	206
5	Ruskin Company	196
6	Kenny's Tile & Floor Covering, Inc.	151
7	Maxi-Seal Harness Systems, Inc.	146
8	United Heating & Cooling	300
10	Durham School Services	123

== Education ==
The majority of Grandview is in the Grandview C-4 School District, which operates six elementary schools, one middle school, Grandview Sr. High School, and Grandview Alternative School.

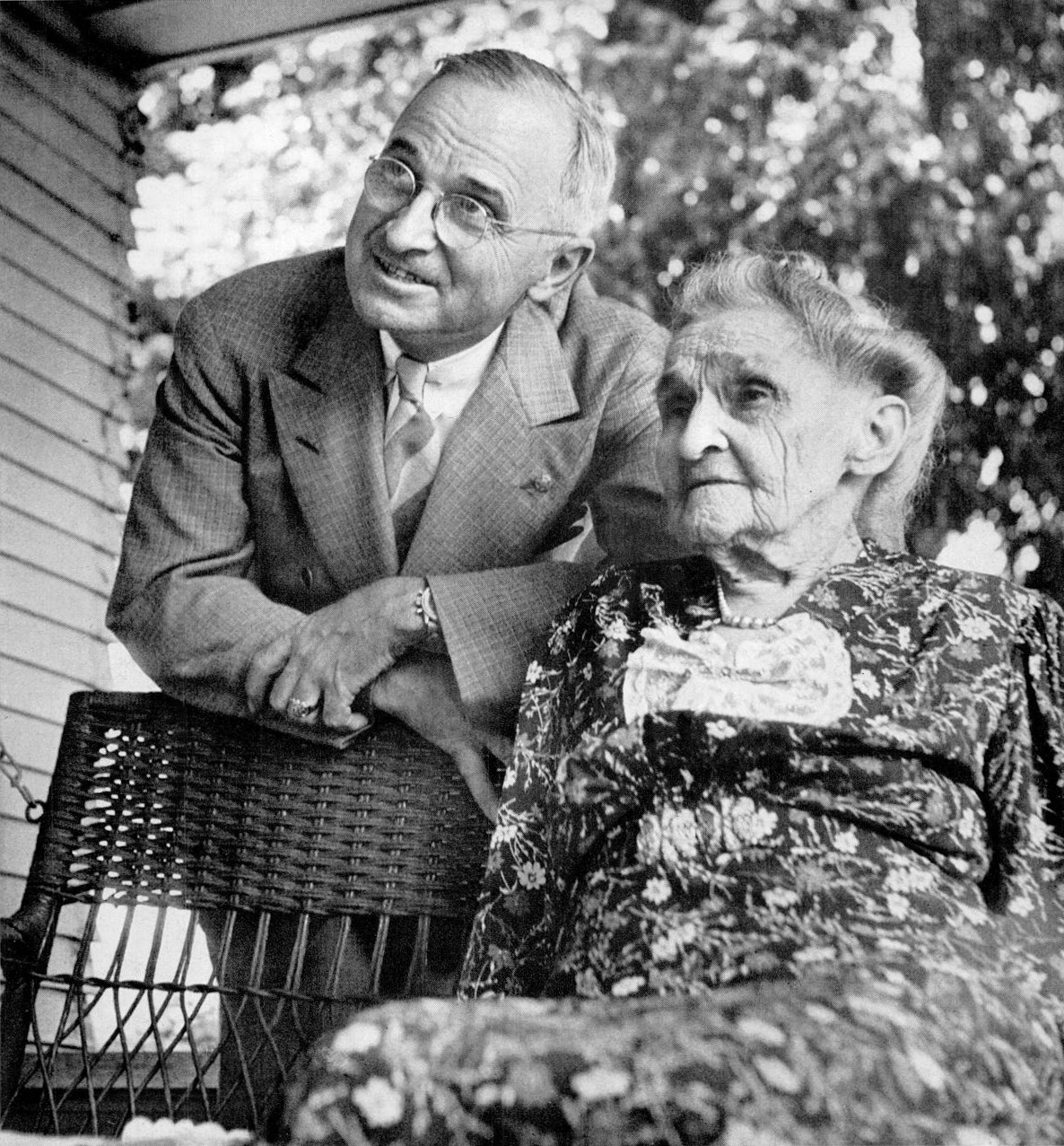
Sen. Harry S. Truman visits his mother in Grandview, Missouri, after being nominated the Democratic candidate for vice president (July 1944)

A small portion is in the Hickman Mills C-1 School District.

Metropolitan Community College has the Grandview and Hickman Mills school districts in its taxation area.

Grandview has a public library, a branch of the Mid-Continent Public Library.

== Notable people ==
- Alec Burks, 2011 1st round pick of the Utah Jazz, attended Grandview High School.
- Josh Freeman, Quarterback for the Indianapolis Colts
- Josh Scott, founder of JHS Pedals
- Harry S. Truman, President of the United States, lived in Grandview for part of his early years.
- Martha Ellen Young Truman, mother of President Harry S. Truman.
- Carl Williams, racing driver
- Xavier Williams, Defensive tackle for the Kansas City Chiefs attended and graduated from Grandview High School.

== See also ==
- List of cities in Missouri
