= Harrington College of Design =

Former design school in Chicago, Illinois

- Type: For-profit
- Active: 1931–2015
- Location: 200 West Madison Street, Chicago, Illinois, United States; 41.88226°N 87.63445°W
- Website: www.harrington.edu

Harrington College of Design (1931–2015) was a for-profit college in the Loop area of Chicago, Illinois, US, that closed in 2015. It offered students programs leading to either a master's, bachelor's or associate's degree upon completion of the interior design, digital photography or communication design programs. Each program was credentialed with multiple levels of accreditation. The college was owned by Career Education Corporation.

== History ==
The college traced its history to 1931 when Frances Harrington, a practicing interior designer, traveled to Chicago to provide a series of lectures for interior design professionals. She soon found a growing interest in the study of interior design and expanded her offerings by creating the Harrington Institute of Interior Design.

As Harrington Institute grew, Harrington began providing diplomas to her qualified day division students. When she retired in 1959, her former student Robert Marks assumed leadership of the school. Marks added many programs and degree options to the school's curriculum. Changes in programs, which then under the guidance of the school's professional Advisory Board, were driven by input from the design industry's professional organizations.

In 2003, Harrington Institute changed its name to Harrington College of Design after being purchased by Career Education Corporation, which proceeded to expand the school's design-related programs of study. The school moved to a new location at 200 W. Madison Street and mandated an annual 20% enrollment increase, which it were able to sustain for a few years until the economy faltered and then crashed in 2008. The campus at 200 W. Madison Street in Chicago closed at the end of the summer semester in August 2015.

== Academics ==
Harrington College of Design offered bachelor's and associate degrees in interior design, digital photography and communication design.

=== Accreditation ===
Harrington was regionally accredited by The Higher Learning Commission of the North Central Association of Colleges and Schools from January 1, 2010, until June 30, 2015, and nationally accredited by the Accrediting Council for Independent Colleges and Schools to award associate, bachelor's and master's degrees. Since the school had both regional accreditation and national accreditation, most schools will accept its credits in transfer and recognize its degrees for entry into graduate programs.

Additionally, Harrington was recognized as a private college by the Illinois Board of Higher Education (IBHE) and was authorized by the IBHE to confer associate, baccalaureate and master's degrees. The interior design program leading to the bachelor of fine arts degree was accredited by the Council for Interior Design Accreditation (formerly FIDER). The college was also accredited by the Council for Interior Design Accreditation.

Harrington College of Design's Bachelor of Fine Arts Degree in interior design was accredited by the Council for Interior Design Accreditation (formerly FIDER). The Associate of Applied Science Degree in interior design was not accredited by the Council for Interior Design Accreditation.

== Campus ==
Harrington had a six-story, 82,000 square feet (7,600 m^{2}) vertical campus located in the Chicago Loop. Three floors of the campus were a display space, designed to hold a mix of classrooms, galleries and offices. Harrington also had an extensive library that contains updated digital research for students.

== Notable alumni ==
- Patricia Taft, interior designer and granddaughter of President William Howard Taft
