= Lynda Bird Johnson Robb =

First Lady of Virginia and daughter of Lyndon B. Johnson (born 1944)

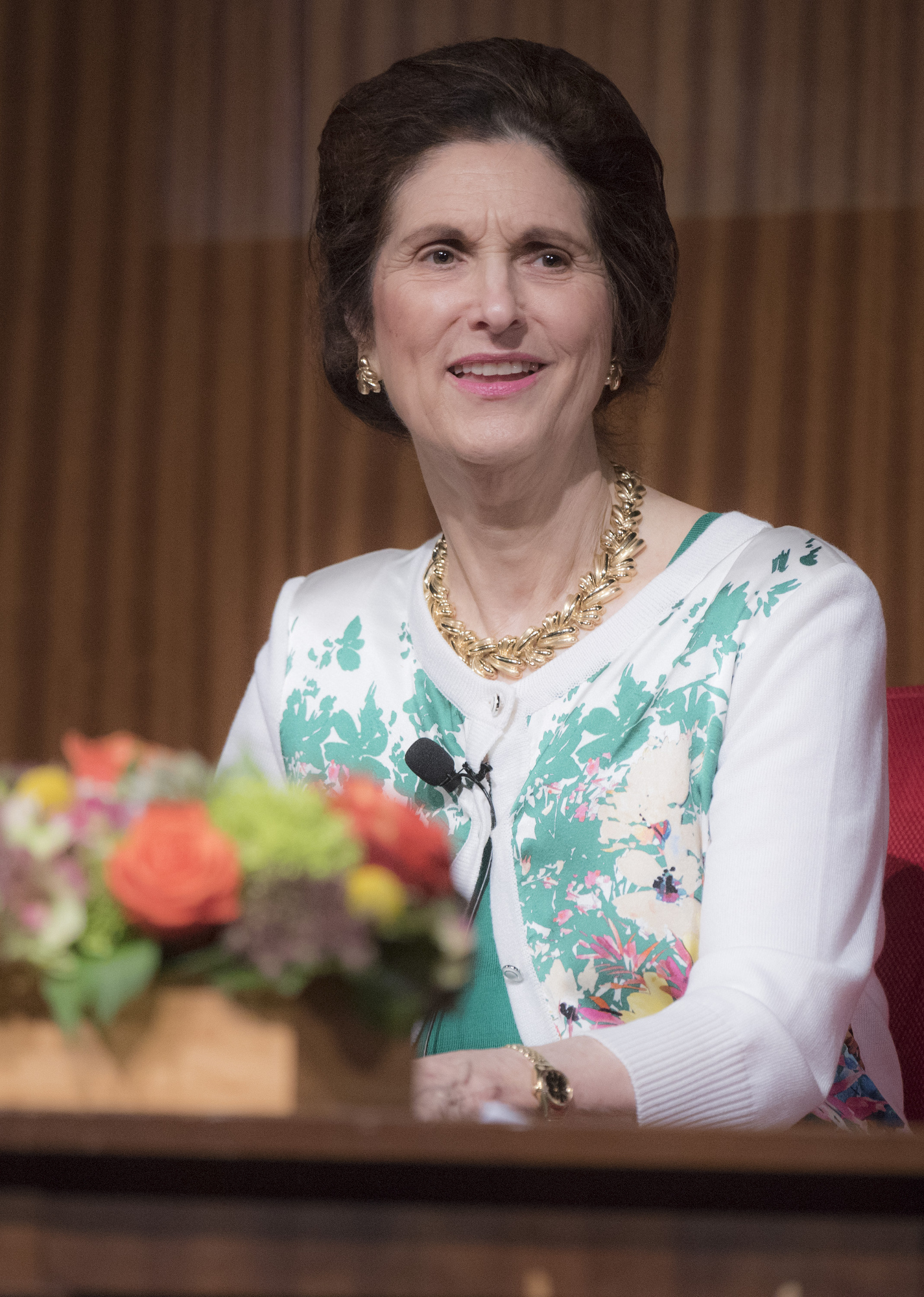
- Johnson Robb in 2018

First Lady of Virginia
- In role January 16, 1982 – January 18, 1986
- Governor: Chuck Robb
- Preceded by: Edwina P. Dalton
- Succeeded by: Jeannie Baliles

Second Lady of Virginia
- In role January 14, 1978 – January 16, 1982
- Lieutenant Governor: Chuck Robb
- Preceded by: Edwina P. Dalton
- Succeeded by: Martha Davis

Personal details
- Born: Lynda Bird Johnson; March 19, 1944 (age 82) Washington, D.C., U.S.
- Party: Democratic
- Spouse: Chuck Robb (m. 1967)
- Children: 3
- Parents: Lyndon B. Johnson; Lady Bird Johnson
- Relatives: Johnson family
- Education: University of Texas at Austin

Lynda Bird Johnson Robb (born March 19, 1944) is the elder daughter of the 36th U.S. president Lyndon B. Johnson and former first lady Lady Bird Johnson. She served as chairwoman of the Board of Reading is Fundamental, the nation's largest children's literacy organization, as well as chairwoman of the President's Advisory Committee for Women. She is a magazine editor who served as First Lady of Virginia from 1982 to 1986, and as Second Lady of Virginia from 1978 to 1982. She is the oldest living child of a U.S. president, following the death of John Eisenhower on December 21, 2013. She serves as a vice president of the Society of Presidential Descendants.

== Biography ==
Before Lynda Bird Johnson was born, her mother Lady Bird had suffered three miscarriages and her doctor spoke pessimistically of her chances of having any more children, so her father suggested that she be named for both her parents. Thus, the name "Lynda Bird".

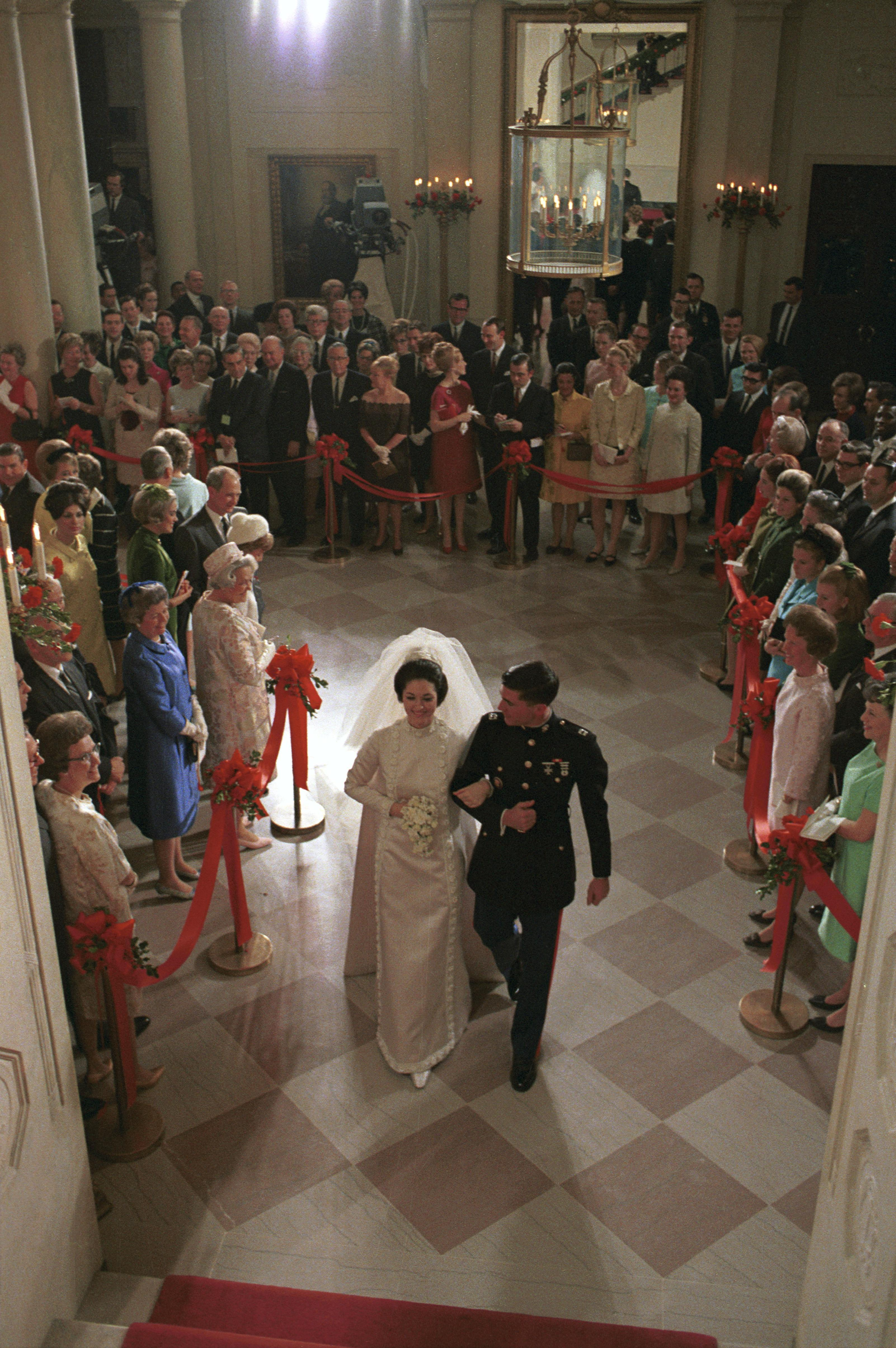
Johnson and Chuck Robb's wedding at the White House, December 9, 1967

Johnson was engaged to Bernard Rosenbach before she met the actor George Hamilton, who himself had been engaged to Susan Kohner. In 1966, Johnson and Hamilton began dating.

Johnson later married U.S. Marine Corps Captain Charles S. Robb.

On May 9, 1979, President Jimmy Carter appointed Lynda Bird Johnson Robb to chair the President's Advisory Committee for Women. The committee of 30 worked to carry out Carter's mandate to promote equality for women in the cultural, social, economic, and political life of the United States.

Robb was educated at the National Cathedral School for Girls, graduated from the University of Texas at Austin, and was a member of Zeta Tau Alpha sorority. She also briefly attended Mercy University.

She has three daughters, Lucinda Desha Robb (born 1968), Catherine Lewis Robb (born 1970) and Jennifer Wickliffe Robb (born 1978).

In 2004, Robb attended the state funeral of President Ronald Reagan, on behalf of her mother, who was unable to attend because of poor health. She again represented her mother at the state funeral of President Gerald Ford, who died December 26, 2006. In 2018, Robb attended the state funeral of George H. W. Bush alongside her husband Charles Robb, her sister Luci Baines Johnson and her brother-in-law Ian Turpin.

Robb serves as a vice president of the Society of Presidential Descendants.
