= Margaret Hayes Clark =

American politician

Mayor of Rosemead, California
- Incumbent
- Assumed office February 2025

Rosemead City Councilwoman
- Incumbent
- Assumed office March 1991

Personal details
- Born: Margaret Hayes
- Party: Republican
- Spouse: Jim Clark
- Children: 8
- Relatives: Rutherford B. Hayes (great-grandfather); Lucy Webb Hayes (great-grandmother)
- Education: University of California, Los Angeles
- Occupation: politician

Margaret Hayes Clark is an American politician. She served as a city councillor, and later as mayor, of Rosemead, California. She is currently serving her seventh term as mayor. Clark is also a board member of the National First Ladies Day Commission. She is the great-granddaughter of President Rutherford B. Hayes and First Lady Lucy Webb Hayes.

== Early life, family, and education ==
Clark is the great-granddaughter of U.S. President Rutherford B. Hayes and U.S. First Lady Lucy Webb Hayes.

She studied at the University of Bordeaux through the University of California's educational abroad program and graduated with a bachelor's degree and a teaching credential from the University of California, Los Angeles.

== Career ==
Clark, who is a member of the Republican Party, was elected to the Rosemead City Council in March 1991. Prior to her election to the city council, she served as a commissioner on the Rosemead planning and traffic commissions in the 1980s. She was elected to her seventh term as mayor of Rosemead in 2024.

Clark reportedly brought financially stability to the city's budget.

Clark served as a founding board member of the San Gabriel and Lower Los Angeles Rivers and Mountains Conservatory. She has also served as president of the Los Angeles County Division of the League of California Cities and was a member of the California Contract Cities Association executive board. Clark was also a representative on the San Gabriel Valley Council of Governments and was the first vice president of the Regional Council of the Southern California Association of Governments, also serving on the association's energy and environment committee.

As a great-granddaughter of First Lady Hayes, she was appointed to the National First Ladies Day Commission.

== Personal life ==
She met her husband, Jim Clark, at church while she was a college student. They have eight children. One of her sons, Rev. Tim Clark, is a Christian pastor.
