= Selwa Roosevelt =

Former U.S. Chief of Protocol and freelance writer (b.1929)

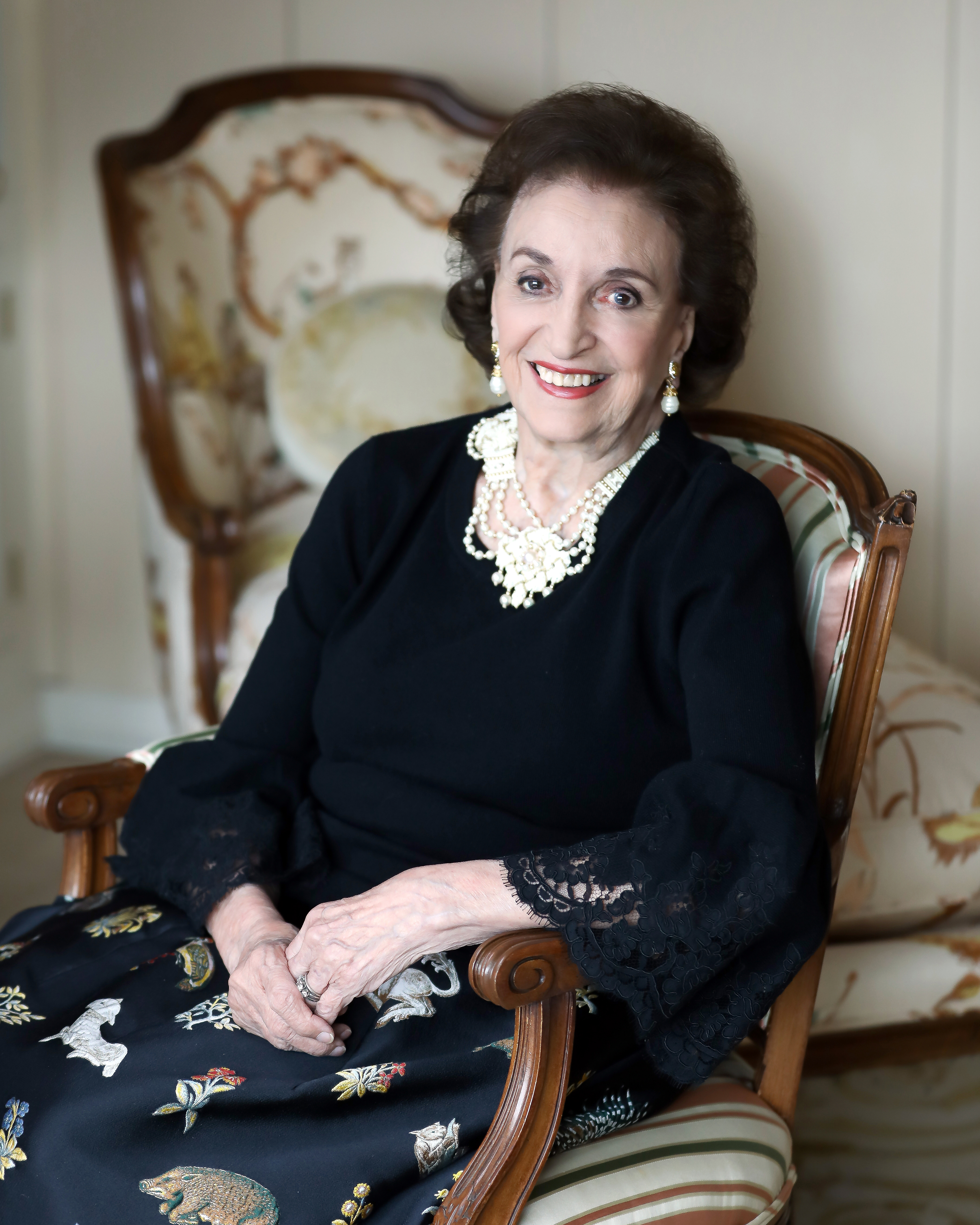
- Selwa "Lucky" Roosevelt

23rd Chief of Protocol of the United States
- In office April 16, 1982 – January 20, 1989
- President: Ronald Reagan
- Preceded by: Leonore Annenberg
- Succeeded by: Joseph Verner Reed Jr.

Personal details
- Born: Selwa Carmen Showker; January 13, 1929 (age 97) Kingsport, Tennessee, U.S.
- Spouse: Archibald Bulloch Roosevelt Jr. (m. 1950; died 1990)
- Occupation: Journalist

Selwa Carmen Showker "Lucky" Roosevelt (born January 13, 1929) is an American journalist, patron of the arts, Chairman Emeritus of the Blair House Foundation, and former Chief of Protocol of the United States under Ronald Reagan, serving longer (1982–1989) than any other person in that position.

== Early life ==
Born Selwa Showker in 1929, the daughter of Lebanese immigrants, she attended public schools in her home town of Kingsport, Tennessee, graduating valedictorian of her high school class. She went on to Vassar College, where she was awarded an A.B. upon graduating in 1950 with honors. That same year, she married Archibald Bulloch Roosevelt Jr., the grandson of 26th U.S. President Theodore Roosevelt.

Selwa's professional journalism and writing career began with work for the local Kingsport Times newspaper at age 16, a job she returned to every summer thereafter between high school and college terms.

== Career ==
After graduating from Vassar, Selwa (now known by the affectionate nickname, “Lucky”) worked for Ladies' Home Journal magazine until she married Archibald Roosevelt, Jr. (a grandson of president Theodore Roosevelt) in September 1950. Soon after marrying, her husband, who was a senior official of the CIA, was posted to Istanbul, Turkey, where they lived from 1951 to 1953.

Roosevelt has worked as a journalist for The Washington Evening Star and a freelance writer for numerous magazines, among them Family Circle, McCalls and Town & Country, where she was a contributing editor for seven years.

She was the longest serving Chief of Protocol serving between 1982 and 1989. In 2012, she received a commendation from President Barack Obama for her government service and for helping to "save" Blair House.

Her correspondence from Fleur Cowles is at the University of Texas at Austin.

== Works ==
- Keeper of the gate, Simon and Schuster, 1990, ISBN 978-0-671-69207-0
