= Clifton Truman Daniel =

American writer and grandson of Harry S. Truman

- Born: June 5, 1957 (age 69); Manhattan, New York, U.S.
- Education: University of North Carolina at Chapel Hill
- Occupations: writer, editor
- Spouse: Polly Bennett (m. 1986)
- Children: 3
- Parents: Clifton Daniel (father); Margaret Truman (mother)
- Relatives: Harry S. Truman (grandfather); Bess Truman (grandmother); Martha Ellen Young Truman (great-grandmother)

Clifton Truman Daniel (born June 5, 1957) is an American writer and public relations executive who is the oldest grandson of former United States President Harry S. Truman and First Lady Bess Truman. He is a son of the late E. Clifton Daniel Jr., former managing editor of The New York Times, and best-selling mystery writer Margaret Truman. He serves as a vice president of the Society of Presidential Descendants.

== Life ==
Daniel was born on June 5, 1957 at Doctors Hospital in Manhattan, New York City, the eldest son of Clifton Daniel and Margaret Truman. He has three brothers, and is Director of Public Relations for Truman College, one of the seven City Colleges of Chicago. Prior to that, he worked as a feature writer and editor for the Morning Star and Sunday Star-News in Wilmington, North Carolina.

Daniel is the honorary chairman of the board of trustees of the Harry S. Truman Library Institute, the member-supported, nonprofit partner of the Harry S. Truman Library and Museum in Independence, Missouri. He is a frequent speaker and fundraiser. He is also a charter member of the board of directors of the National First Ladies Day Commission.

Following in his grandfather's footsteps, Daniel is a brother in Freemasonry through various appendant bodies. On December 3, 2011, Most Worshipful Brother Terry L. Seward, Grand Master of the Grand Lodge of Illinois, made Brother Daniel a Mason at sight. In August 2021, he was inducted into the class of 33° Honorary Members of the Scottish Rite, NMJ, serving as Exemplar for his class. He has been a Scottish Rite Mason since 2014 and is a member of the Valley of Chicago.

Daniel visited Hiroshima and Nagasaki in 2012, the sites where his grandfather had ordered the only use of atomic bombs for warfare in history. He has frequently been asked to comment on that 1945 decision to use nuclear weapons.

He appeared in 2016 on Race for the White House as a commentator for his grandfather's experiences during both his first term and the 1948 United States presidential election.

Since 2017, he has acted the role of his grandfather in performances of the 1975 play Give 'em Hell, Harry!.

Daniel attended Milton Academy and the University of North Carolina at Chapel Hill. He married Polly Bennett in 1986, on the 67th wedding anniversary of his grandparents.

His first book, Growing up with my Grandfather, was published in 1995. In addition to including his memories of his grandparents, it frankly discusses his descent into drug and alcohol abuse, and return to sobriety.

Daniel is a vice president of the Society of Presidential Descendants.

== Works ==
Daniel is the author of two books:

- Growing Up With My Grandfather: Memories of Harry S. Truman. Birch Lane Press. 1995. ISBN 978-1559722865.
- Dear Harry, Love Bess: Bess Truman's Letters to Harry Truman, 1919-1943. Truman State University Press. 2011. ISBN 978-1935503255.
