= Harrison Tweed =

American lawyer and civic leader (1885–1969)

- Born: October 18, 1885; New York City, New York, U.S.
- Died: June 16, 1969 (aged 83)
- Education: St. Mark's School; Harvard College (B.A., 1907); Harvard Law School (LL.B., 1910)
- Occupations: Lawyer and civic leader
- Spouses: Eleanor Roelker (m. 1914; div. 1928) Blanche Oelrichs (m. 1929; div. 1942) Barbara Banning (m. 1942)
- Children: 3
- Relatives: Tweed Roosevelt (grandson); William M. Evarts (maternal grandfather)

Harrison Tweed (October 18, 1885 – June 16, 1969) was an American lawyer and civic leader.

== Life and career ==
Tweed was born in New York City on October 18, 1885. He was the son of Charles Harrison Tweed, the general counsel for the Central Pacific Railroad, Chesapeake and Ohio Railway, and other affiliated railroad corporations, and his wife, (Helen) Minerva Evarts. His maternal grandfather was William M. Evarts, who served successively from 1868 to 1891 as United States Attorney General, United States Secretary of State, and United States Senator from New York, and was one of the leaders of the American Bar Association. His maternal great, great, great grandfather was Paul Dudley Sargent Revolutionary war hero, one of the founding overseers of Bowdoin College. Tweed graduated from St. Mark's School in Southborough, Massachusetts, and received a B.A. degree from Harvard College in 1907. At Harvard Law School, he served on the law review and was awarded an LL.B. in 1910.

His career at the bar began with a clerkship in the office of Byrne and Cutcheon in New York City. After service as a captain in World War I, he joined one of the predecessor firms to Milbank, Tweed, Hadley & McCloy, where he remained as a partner the remainder of his life. Milbank, Tweed was the outside legal arm of Chase Manhattan Bank and the Rockefeller family. Tweed specialized in drafting wills and trust agreements, for the administering of major estates. He wrote briefs in litigation arising out of them and argued, and won, several notable appeals in the New York courts and the United States Supreme Court. Because he was born partially deaf, he never tried a case. In conferences with other lawyers he usually spoke last, and his views generally became the group's consensus. Imitating Justice Oliver Wendell Holmes, he had no desk in his office, instead writing at a lectern.

Tweed's appointment as chairman of the legal aid committee of the Association of the Bar of the City of New York in 1932, led to a continuing involvement in bar organizations. He became an enthusiastic convert to the necessity of providing competent legal services to all people. Legal aid, he wrote, was "operation equal justice", "an obligation of the bar", and essential to secure the success of the adversary system. He served as president of the Legal Aid Society of New York from 1936 to 1945, later publishing a history of its first seventy-five years, and of the National Legal Aid & Defender Association from 1949 to 1955.

In 1945, Tweed was elected president of the New York City bar association. To rejuvenate the staid organization, he brought in younger lawyers, established a bulletin, reorganized committees that issued reports, and created the position of executive secretary. All of this was done in a spirit of openness, equality, informality, and fun (a recurring word with Tweed). In this way, Tweed transformed a stuffy club into a strong progressive force for public service. C. C. Burlingham, the doyen of the New York bar, said that Tweed was "the best president the Bar Association has ever had".

In 1947, Tweed became president of the American Law Institute (ALI). He was a guiding force in its major labors—the updating of the institute's published Restatements, as well as the preparation of the Uniform Commercial Code, model codes and statutes on penal law and taxation, and the first restatement on the foreign-relations law of the United States. He took a light, subtle approach, usually talking around the matter at hand so as to envelop the object of his attention; only occasionally did he take a direct part in the proceedings over which he smoothly presided.

Starting in 1947, Tweed was chairman of the ALI - American Bar Association (ABA) joint committee on continuing legal education. Refreshment of the law, Tweed believed, was a professional responsibility. He wrote articles, spoke to lawyers' groups, buttonholed bar leaders, and organized conferences. For many years, a colleague noted, he "was the committee". The number of administrators of state continuing-legal-education programs increased markedly during his tenure.

Educational matters and public service occupied much of Tweed's time. He served as a trustee of Sarah Lawrence College from 1940 to 1965, including eight years as chairman of the board of trustees (1947 to 1955), and was interim president of the college in 1959-1960. In his term as interim president, he is credited with saving the college from bankruptcy by increasing the number of students. He also served as an overseer of Harvard University from 1950 to 1956, and from 1951 to 1967 he was a trustee of the Cooper Union Center for the Advancement of Science and Art in New York City.

New York Governor Thomas E. Dewey in 1953 appointed him chairman of the state’s commission to study the reorganization of the judicial branch (courts); many of its recommendations, including the formation of a new judicial conference of the state's judges, were later adopted by the state. In 1963, at the request of US President John F. Kennedy, Tweed became co-chairman of the Lawyers' Committee for Civil Rights Under Law, a position that he held for two years.

Tweed believed that lawyers' training to define complicated issues enabled them to play a special role outside the practice of law: "Even if he contributes nothing more than a sense of orderliness and an ability to organize thought and to pose the right questions, the lawyer will have pulled his weight in the boat." Of his year as president of Sarah Lawrence College, he wrote, "I think that I did manage to bring to the faculty an organization and an understanding of democratic procedures which no one but a lawyer could have done."

Tall, erect, and lean, Tweed was "the most democratic of aristocrats". He was the only lawyer to be awarded medals for distinguished service from the New York City, New York State, and American bar associations. The ABA tribute noted that his was "the Horatio Alger story in reverse". "I have a high opinion of lawyers," Tweed said in 1945. "With all their faults, they stack up well against those in every other occupation or profession. They are better to work with or play with or fight with or drink with than most other varieties of mankind." He died in New York City.

== Family ==
Tweed was married three times and divorced twice. By his first marriage on June 14, 1914, to author Eleanor Jenckes Roelker (1890–1952), daughter of Rhode Island politician William Greene Roelker, he had two children. Following his divorce in 1928, he married Blanche Oelrichs Barrymore, the former wife of John Barrymore who used the name Michael Strange in her acting and writing careers. They were divorced in 1942. He married Barbara Banning on 21 November 1942; they had one child.

His daughters (with Eleanor J. Roelker) Eleanor Tweed, married Nelson W. Aldrich (a grandson of U.S. Senator Nelson W. Aldrich); and Katharine Winthrop Tweed, married Archibald Bulloch Roosevelt Jr. (a grandson of U.S. President Theodore Roosevelt). Through his eldest daughter, Eleanor, he was the grandfather of Nelson W. Aldrich Jr. Through his daughter, Katherine, he was the grandfather of Tweed Roosevelt.
