= National Day Calendar =

Website and online database of holidays

- Founded: January 19, 2013; 13 years ago in North Dakota
- Founder: Marlo Anderson
- Headquarters: Mandan, North Dakota, U.S.
- Parent: Zoovio Inc.
- Website: www.nationaldaycalendar.com

National Day Calendar is a website and online database of holidays, consisting of both widely recognized celebrations—such as religious celebrations and public holidays—and "sponsored" days—where an individual or organization pays to have a specific holiday listed on the website. It was founded January 19, 2013 by Marlo Anderson. Anderson was inspired to create the site when trying and failing to find information about a "National Popcorn Day".

The holidays listed on the site are commonly featured in local newspapers, on radio programs and on social media. The site's services have also featured on televisions shows, such as a 2019 episode of Vanderpump Rules.

In 2018, it was reported that, with C3 Entertainment, the company was developing a movie based on Anderson's experiences with the National Day Calendar, under the name National Daze.
