= List of Delta Delta Delta members =

Delta Delta Delta is a collegiate social sorority located in North America. Following are some of its notable members.

== Arts ==
| Name | Chapter | Notability | Ref. |
|---|---|---|---|
| Kara Medoff Barnett | Alpha Omicron | managing director of Lincoln Center International, executive director of American Ballet Theatre | |
| Cathy Guisewite | Iota | creator of the comic strip Cathy; Emmy Award winner | |
| Candace Whittemore Lovely | Eta | impressionist painter | |

== Beauty pageant contestants ==
| Name | Chapter | Notability | Ref. |
|---|---|---|---|
| Donna Axum | Delta Iota | Miss America 1964, television producer | |
| Peyton Bolling | Delta Iota | Miss America's Teen 2025 | |
| Brittany Dawn Brannon | Gamma Rho | Miss Arizona USA 2011, actress, model | |
| Candace Michelle Brown | Phi Theta | Miss Alabama 1992; runner-up Miss America | |
| Leanza Cornett | Beta Gamma | Miss America 1993, television host | |
| Julie Hayek | Theta Pi | Miss California USA 1983, Miss USA 1983, actress, model | |
| Lynn Herring | Delta Omega | Miss Virginia 1977, actress in General Hospital | |
| Crystal Lee | Omega | Miss California 2013, first runner-up Miss America 2014, in-arena host for Golden State Warriors | |
| Carly Mathis | Alpha Rho | Miss Georgia 2013 | |
| Jaclyn Stapp | Alpha Delta | Miss New York USA 2004, Mrs. Florida America 2008, model | |
| Shawn Weatherly | Beta Theta | Miss Universe 1980, actress | |
| Tyler Willis | Phi Eta | Miss Texas USA 2005 | |
| Melissa Witek | Alpha Psi | Miss Florida USA 2005 | |

== Business and education ==
| Name | Chapter | Notability | Ref. |
|---|---|---|---|
| Sara Blakely | Alpha Eta | founder of Spanx | |
| Angela Braly | Phi Eta | president and chief executive officer of WellPoint (now Anthem) | |
| Amber Abbott Burda | Beta Xi | COO and General Manager of the Houston Livestock Show & Rodeo | |
| Maureen Kempston Darkes | Canada Alpha | lawyer; vice president General Motors Group; president GM Latin America, Africa and Middle East | |
| Libby Leffler | Pi | tech founder; Founder and CEO of First; former chief of staff to Sheryl Sandberg | |
| Gayle Jennings-O’Byrne | Psi | venture capitalist; CEO of Wocstar Capital; co-founder of the Wocstar Fund | |

== Education ==
| Name | Chapter | Notability | Ref. |
|---|---|---|---|
| Madeleine Wing Adler | Upsilon | first female president of West Chester University of Pennsylvania | |
| Betsy Boze | Theta Kappa | president of The College of The Bahamas | |
| Winifred B. Chase | Iota | botanist, professor of botany, and dean of women at what is now Wayne State University | |
| Laura Kuykendall | Theta Epsilon | College professor, dean of women at Southwestern University | |
| Ida Shaw Martin | Alpha | founded Delta Delta Delta sorority | |
| Bessie Leach Priddy | Gamma | College professor, dean of women at the Michigan State Normal College (now Eastern Michigan University) and the University of Missouri, National Delta Delta Delta historian, published A Detailed Record of Delta Delta Delta, 1888-1907, elected Delta Delta Delta National President in 1931 | |
| Ivy Kellerman Reed | Nu | linguist and author of materials in Esperanto | |
| Annette Nevin Shelby | Delta Mu | first woman tenured professor at Georgetown University's McDonough School of Business | |
| Lynn Yeakel | Alpha Xi | director of Drexel University College of Medicine's Institute for Women's Health and Leadership | |

== Entertainment ==
| Name | Chapter | Notability | Ref. |
|---|---|---|---|
| Elizabeth Banks | Psi | actress | |
| Lee Phillip Bell | Upsilon | talk show host | |
| Jodi Benson | Delta Epsilon | actress | |
| Shannon Beveridge | Theta Gamma | actress, YouTube personality, LGBT advocate | |
| Dixie Carter | Delta Sigma | actress | |
| Kellie Coffey | Theta Gamma | country music singer | |
| Mary Crosby | Theta Zeta | actress, Dallas | |
| Annamary Dickey | Delta Epsilon | soprano and actress | |
| Farrah Fawcett | Theta Zeta | actress | |
| Joanna Garcia | Alpha Eta | actress | |
| Cynthia Geary | Chi | Emmy-nominated actress | |
| Leeza Gibbons | Alpha Lambda | actress, talk show host, Emmy Award winner | |
| Lynn Herring | Delta Omega | actress in General Hospital, Miss Virginia 1977 | |
| Crystal Lee | Omega | in-arena host for Golden State Warriors, Miss California 2013, first runner-up Miss America 2014 | |
| Natalia Livingston | Alpha Omega | Emmy Award-winning actress, General Hospital | |
| Julie Montagu, Countess of Sandwich | Delta Omicron | Television host, An American Aristocrat's Guide to Great Estates | |
| Amanda Schull | Delta Omicron | actress, Center Stage, One Tree Hill | |
| Molly Sims | Delta Gamma | actress, model | |
| Sylvia Stahlman | Delta Gamma | soprano, opera singer | |
| Savitree Suttichanond | Beta Upsilon | singer on TrueVisions's Academy Fantasia | |
| Toni Tennille | Phi Theta | singer in Captain & Tennille | |

== Journalism and news ==
| Name | Chapter | Notability | Ref. |
|---|---|---|---|
| Kiran Chetry | Alpha Pi | news anchor for CNN and Fox News | |
| Katie Couric | Beta Sigma | Emmy Award winning news anchor, CBS Evening News | |
| Catherine Crier | Theta Zeta | Emmy Award-winning broadcast journalist, author, and former Texas State District Judge | |
| Hoda Kotb | Beta Nu | Emmy Award-winning news anchor for NBC News' morning show Today and correspondent for Dateline NBC | |
| Vinita Nair | Upsilon | news anchor | |
| Deborah Norville | Alpha Rho | Emmy Award winner, news anchor of Inside Edition, author | |
| Kathy Orr | Omicron | meteorologist | |
| Janet Shamlian | Delta Xi | NBC news correspondent | |
| Sally Stapleton | Delta Xi | photojournalist | |

== Law ==
| Name | Chapter | Nobility | Ref. |
|---|---|---|---|
| Annette Abbott Adams | Alpha Mu | lawyer, judge, first woman to be the Assistant Attorney General in the United States | |
| Pam Bondi | Alpha Psi | Former Attorney General, United States of America; Former Florida Attorney General | |
| Bobbe Bridge | Theta Alpha | former Associate Justice of the Washington Supreme Court | |
| Rita Garman | Delta Pi | justice of the Supreme Court of Illinois | |
| Elizabeth A. Kovachevich | Alpha Chi | judge of the United States District Court for the Middle District of Florida | |

== Literature ==
| Name | Chapter | Notability | Ref. |
|---|---|---|---|
| Joan Didion | Pi | author, recipient of the National Book Award for Nonfiction | |
| Sara Haardt | Xi | author and professor of English literature | |
| Kristin Hannah | Theta Alpha | novelist | |
| Doris Kearns Goodwin | Alpha Upsilon | Pulitzer Prize-winning author and historian | |
| Evelyn Sibley Lampman | Theta Mu | writer of children's and young adult fiction | |
| Jill Marie Landis | Phi Kappa | novelist | |
| Jo Piazza | Psi | novelist | |
| Anne Rivers Siddons | Phi Theta | novelist | |

== Military and aviation ==
| Name | Chapter | Notability | Ref. |
|---|---|---|---|
| Terry Gabreski | Delta Omega | U.S. Air Force Lt. general; Vice Commander of Air Force Materiel Command at Wright-Patterson Air Force Base | |
| Betty Gillies | Psi | first pilot to qualify for the Women's Auxiliary Ferrying Squadron | |
| Louise Thaden | Delta Iota | aviation pioneer; first woman to win the Bendix trophy | |
| Nora W. Tyson | Delta Gamma | United States Navy vice admiral | |

== Politics and public service ==
| Name | Chapter | Notability | Ref. |
|---|---|---|---|
| Lisa Boscola | Gamma Beta | Pennsylvania State Senate | |
| Debra Bowen | Phi Gamma | Secretary of State of California | |
| Nellie A. Brown | Iota | botanist, scientific investigator in Plant Pathology at the U.S. Department of Agriculture Bureau of Plant Industry | |
| Kathy Castor | Alpha Omega | Congresswoman for Florida's 11th congressional district | |
| Nellie Connally | Theta Zeta | former First Lady of Texas | |
| Elizabeth Dole | Alpha Omicron | U.S. Senator from North Carolina, former United States Secretary of Transportation | |
| Carol Boyd Hallett | Theta Delta | California State Assembly. U.S. Ambassador to the Bahamas, Commissioner of the U.S. Customs Service | |
| Helen Froelich Holt | Upsilon | former Secretary of State of West Virginia | |
| Adele Khoury Graham | Alpha Psi | former teacher and First Lady of Florida | |
| Katherine F. Lenroot | Mu | chief of the United States Children's Bureau, feminist | |
| Michelle Lujan-Grisham | Phi Delta | Governor of New Mexico | |
| Mary Martha Presley Merritt | Delta Rho | member of the West Virginia House of Delegates and president of the West Virginia Board of Education | |
| Alida Isham Millham | Beta | member of the New Hampshire House of Representatives | |
| Kelley Paul | Delta Psi | political consultant, writer, wife of Rand Paul | |
| Dina Powell | Theta Theta | U.S. Deputy National Security Advisor for Strategy | |
| Patricia Taft | Delta Gamma | Charter board member of the National First Ladies Day Commission, board member of the Society of Presidential Descendants, and great-granddaughter of President William Howard Taft | |
| Presley Merritt Wagoner | Alpha Epsilon | 40th President General of the National Society Daughters of the American Revolution | |

== Sports ==
| Names | Chapter | Notability | Ref. |
|---|---|---|---|
| Anne Abernathy | Theta Zeta | Olympic athlete in luge and archery | |
| Faye Biles | Alpha Omicron | head coach of field hockey and lacrosse teams, Kent State University | |
| Sophie Caldwell Hamilton | Gamma Gamma | cross-country ski racer | |
| Meryl Davis | Iota | gold medalist ice dancer, 2014 Winter Olympics | |
| Marianna Davis | Omega | Paralympic cyclist, alpine skier, member of the Idaho House of Representatives | |
| Annika Dries | Omega | gold medalist in water polo, 2012 Summer Olympics | |
| Sophie Caldwell Hamilton | Gamma Gamma | cross country skier, 2014 Winter Olympics | |
| Abby Johnston | Alpha Omicron | silver medalist in synchronized diving, 2012 Summer Olympics | |
| Mariya Koroleva | Omega | 2012 USA Olympic synchronized swimming duet team | |
| Paige Railey | Beta Alpha | competitive sailor, Olympian | |

== See also ==
- List of Delta Delta Delta chapters
