= List of Delta Delta Delta alumnae chapters =

Delta Delta Delta is a North American collegiate women's fraternity. It was founded on November 27, 1888, at Boston University. In the following list of chapters, active chapters are indicated in bold and inactive chapters are in italics.

Chapter	Alumnae Alliance name	Charter date and range	City or region	State, province, or country	Status	Ref.
**Boston, MA**	Alpha	August 29, 1892	Boston	Massachusetts	Active	
**Galesburg, IL**	Epsilon	March 2, 1896	Galesburg	Illinois	Active	
**Chicago Loop Group, IL**	Chicago Alumnae Alliance	May 15, 1897 – 1901; 1907	Chicago	Illinois	Active	(Note: Chapter was chartered as the Chicago Alumnae Alliance.)
**Cincinnati, OH**	Zeta	September 2, 1897	Cincinnati	Ohio	Active	
Adrian, MI	Gamma	January 8, 1898 – January 1929	Adrian	Michigan	Inactive	
Middletown, CT	Sigma	June 28, 1898 – December 20, 1969	Middletown	Connecticut	Inactive	
Baldwin City, KS	Lambda	April 1899 – November 1900; 1908	Baldwin City	Kansas	Inactive	
Syracuse, NY	Omicron	October 27, 1900	Syracuse	New York	Inactive	
**Ann Arbor, MI**	Iota	1900–1902; April 1915	Ann Arbor	Michigan	Active	(Note: Chapter was called Ann Arbor/Ypsilati from 1948 to 1982.)
**Minneapolis/St. Paul, MN**	Theta	May 18, 1901	Minneapolis and Saint Paul	Minnesota	Active	
**Indianola, IA**	Delta	October 28, 1901 – 1904; 1906	Indianola	Iowa	Active	
Burlington, VT	Eta	June 1902–May 1944; February 2, 1948	Burlington	Vermont	Inactive	
Canton, NY	Beta	June 19, 1903 – April 1960	Canton	New York	Active	
New York City	Rho	June 1904	New York City	New York	Inactive	
**Denver, CO**	Theta Beta	May 11, 1905	Denver	Colorado	Active	
**Los Angeles, CA**	Los Angeles	December 1905 – 1923; August 4, 1951	Los Angeles	California	Active	(Note: Chapter was called Los Angeles until 1951 when its name was changed to Los Angeles Westside. Later, its name returned to Los Angeles.)
Berkeley, CA	Pi	1905–1968	Berkeley	California	Consolidated	(Note: 28 members from this chapter joined the East Bay chapter in May 1978.)
**Madison Area, WI**	Mu	January 2, 1906	Madison	Wisconsin	Active	
**Columbus, OH**	Nu	March 30, 1906	Columbus	Ohio	Active	
**Lincoln, NE**	Kappa	May 19, 1906	Lincoln	Nebraska	Active	
**Des Moines, IA**		1907–1910; November 1913	Des Moines	Iowa	Active	
Evanston, IL	Tau	November 1907–April 1951	Evanston	Illinois	Consolidated	(Note: Chapter merged with North Shore, IL, now North Shore/Glenbrook, IL.)
**Baltimore Alumnae of Tri Delta**	XI	March 30, 1908	Baltimore	Maryland	Active	
Waterville, ME	Alpha Tau	June 1908–June 1939	Waterville	Maine	Inactive	
Norfolk, VA		January 1909–November 1928; February 5, 1935	Norfolk	Virginia	Inactive	
**Milwaukee, WI**		April 1909–November 1912; January 1932	Milwaukee	Wisconsin	Active	
Iowa City, IA	Phi	June 15, 1909 – November 1918; February 1921	Iowa City	Iowa	Inactive	
**Seattle, WA**	Theta Alpha	December 4, 1909	Seattle	Washington	Active	
Washington, D.C.		April 23, 1910 – February 1983; 20xx ?–2016	Washington	District of Columbia	Consolidated	(Note: Chapter became Montgomery County, MD. Later, it returned to its original name. In 2016, it merged with Northern Virginia, VA chapter to form the Washington, D.C. Metro chapter.)
Greencastle, IN	Delta Alpha	1911––November 1924	Greencastle	Indiana	Consolidated	(Note: Chapter merged with Terre Haute, IN chapter.)
Eugene, OR	Theta Delta	February 1911–November 1918; February 1921	Eugene	Oregon	Inactive	
**Kansas City MO/Shawnee Mission, KS**		April 28, 1911 – November 1918; March 1934	Shawnee Mission	Kansas	Active	
Norman, OK	Theta Gamma (First)	September 1911–November 1918; November 1929	Norman	Oklahoma	Inactive	
**Oxford, MS**	Chi	April 19, 1912 – 1935; March 1949	Oxford	Mississippi	Active	
DeLand, FL	Alpha Delta	May 17, 1912 – June 1922; April 9, 1932	DeLand	Florida	Inactive	
**Decatur, IL**	Delta Epsilon	June 1912	Decatur	Illinois	Active	
**Franklin, IN**	Delta Zeta	November 1912	Franklin	Indiana	Active	
**Cedar Rapids, IA**	Delta Eta	November 19, 1912	Cedar Rapids	Iowa	Active	
Ithaca, NY	Alpha Beta	January 1913 – 1914; November 1928	Ithaca	New York	Inactive	
Brooklyn, NY	Alpha Alpha	February 16, 1913	Brooklyn	New York	Inactive	
Marion, AL	Delta Theta	May 20, 1913 – May 1916	Marion	Alabama	Inactive	
**Indianapolis, IN**	Delta Lambda	June 1913	Indianapolis	Indiana	Active	
Pueblo, CO		November 1913–June 1922; 1947–May 1974	Pueblo	Colorado	Inactive	
Fayetteville, AR	Delta Iota	November 13, 1913 – November 1918; December 1, 1950	Fayetteville	Arkansas	Inactive	
**Portland, OR**		November 1913 – 1971; 1978	Portland	Oregon	Active	(Note: Portland, OR split into East Portland and West Portland from 1971. The two chapters consolidated again in 1978.)
**Atlanta, GA**		February 1914–June 1922; January 1927	Atlanta	Georgia	Active	
**Ames, IA**	Psi Delta	February 1914	Ames	Iowa	Active	
**Oxford, OH**		February 1914–February 1919; November 23, 1937	Oxford	Ohio	Active	
**Reno, NV**	Theta Theta	February 1914	Reno	Nevada	Active	
**Rochester, NY**		February 1914	Rochester	New York	Active	
**St. Louis, MO**	Delta Phi	February 1914	St. Louis	Missouri	Active	
**Springfield, MO**	Delta Kappa	February 1914	Springfield	Missouri	Active	
**Lexington, KY**	Beta Zeta	April 1914–June 1922; November 1927	Lexington	Kentucky	Active	
Lake City, FL		September 14, 1914 – 1948	Lake City	Florida	Inactive	
**Cleveland, OH**		November 1914	Cleveland	Ohio	Active	(Note: Chapter was chartered as Cleveland, OH but changed to Cleveland West Side in 1923. Later, the name reverted.)
Detroit/Grosse Pointe, MI		November 1914	Grosse Pointe	Michigan	Inactive	
**Lafayette, IN**		November 1914–February 1921; November 15, 1960	Lafayette	Indiana	Active	
Lynchburg, VA	Alpha Xi	November 1914–March 1926; August 29, 1951 – May 1958	Lynchburg	Virginia	Inactive	
**Omaha, NE**		November 1914	Omaha	Nebraska	Active	
Sioux City, IA		November 1914–October 1917	Sioux City	Iowa	Inactive	
Wooster, OH	Delta Delta	November 1914–June 1922	Wooster	Ohio	Inactive	
Alliance, OH	Delta Nu	February 1915	Aliance	Ohio	Inactive	
**San Diego, CA**		February 1915–June 1922; January 1929	San Diego	California	Active	
**Spokane, WA**		November 1915 – 1926; January 1934	Spokane	Washington	Active	
**Laramie, WY**		November 5, 1915 – 1944; October 1951	Laramie	Wyoming	Active	
Stanford, CA	Omega	February 1916–May 1929	Stanford	California	Inactive	
**Jacksonville, FL**		June 1916 – 1918; 1925–1930; December 20, 1935	Jacksonville	Florida	Active	
**Dallas**	Theta Kappa	November 18, 1918	Dallas	Texas	Active	
**Oklahoma City / Edmond, OK**	Theta Gamma (Second)	June 1919	Oklahoma City and Edmond	Orklahoma	Active	(Note: Chapter formed as Oklahoma City, OK.)
**Little Rock, AR**	Delta Iota	June 1920–April 1925; May 23, 1935	Little Rock	Arkansas	Active	
Urbana, IL		June 1920–November 1925	Urbana	Illinois	Inactive	(Note: Chapter merged with Champaign, IL.)
Dayton, OH		November 1920	Dayton	Ohio	Inactive	
Opelika, AL	Delta Mu	1921–1922	Opelika	Alabama	Consolidated	(Note: Merged with Auburn, AL Alumnae chapter.)
**Wichita, KS**		February 1921	Wichita	Kansas	Active	
**Birmingham, AL**	Delta Mu	June 1921–September 1937; March 31, 1948	Birmingham	Alabama	Active	
Middlebury, VT		September 1921–March 1929	Middlebury	Vermont	Inactive	
Nacogdoches/Lufkin, TX		1922	Nacogdoches	Texas	Inactive	(Note: Chapter formed as Nacogdoches, TX and merged with Lufkin, TX in 1968.)
**Fort Collins, CO**	Theta Lambda	February 1922	Fort Collins	Colorado	Active	
**Manhattan, KS**	Theta Iota	April 1922 – 1943; 1946	Manhattan	Kansas	Active	
Beloit, WI		1923	Beloit	West Virginia	Inactive	
Miami, FL		November 1923–April 1925; 1935–1947; 1973–1980; May 4, 1984	Miami	Florida	Inactive	(Note: Chapter formed by splitting off from Fort Myers, FL.)
Tacoma, WA		November 1923–October 1940; August 1946	Tacoma	Washington	Inactive	
Chicago South Suburban, IL		April 1925		Illinois	Inactive	(Note: Chapter formed as Chicago South Shore.)
**Tulsa, OK**		April 1925	Tulsa	Oklahoma	Active	
**Houston, TX**		November 1925	Houston	Texas	Active	
Albany, NY		February 1926	Albany	New York	Inactive	(Note: Chapter was called Albany-Schenectady, NY from 1926 to 1929.)
**Champaign-Urbana Tri Delta**	Delta Pi	April 1926–March 1931; January 1934	Champaign and Urbana	Illinois	Active	(Note: Charter was chartered as Champaign, IL. It merged with Urbana, IL in 1926.)
Chicago West Suburban, IL		July 1926		Illinois	Inactive	
**Chicago SW Suburban, IL**		May 1928	Chicago	Illinois	Active	
Huntington, WV		November 1928 – 1939; March 26, 1963 – 1977	Huntington	West Virginia	Consolidated	(Note: Joined with Ashland, KY to create the Tri City, KY chapter.)
Schenectady, NY		1929 – February 2, 1971	Schenectady	New York	Inactive	(Note: Chapter formed from Albany-Schenectady, NY, now called Albany, NY.)
Pasadena Area, CA		September 1929 – 20xx ?	Pasadena	California	Inactive	
**San Antonio, TX**		November 1929	San Antonio	Texas	Active	
**Fort Wayne, IN**		November 29, 1929 – 1938; 1947–1951; 1981	Fort Wayne	Indiana	Active	(Note: Chapter merged with North Indiana to become Northeast Indiana/Fort Wayne, IN from 1951 to 1981.)
**Bloomington/Normal, IL**		January 1930–May 1935; July 1973	Bloomington and Normal	Illinois	Active	(Note: Chapter was chartered as Bloomington, IL. Normal joined when it was reformed in 1973.)
Newark/Granville, OH		March 1930	Newark and Granville	Ohio	Inactive	(Note: Chapter was called Central Ohio until 1942. Later, it was called Granville.)
**Mobile, AL**		April 7, 1930 – 1939; March 1959	Mobile	Alabama	Active	
Manilla, PH		January 13, 1931 – 1940	Manila	Philippines	Inactive	
Walla Walla, WA		March 1931–October 1973	Walla Walla	Washington	Inactive	
**Toledo, OH**		November 1931	Toledo	Ohio	Active	
Dayton Beach, FL		March 1932	Dayton Beach	Florida	Inactive	
**Fort Worth**		April 18, 1932	Fort Worth	Texas	Active	
**Salt Lake City, UT**		May 1932	Salt Lake City	Utah	Active	
Tuscaloosa, AL		January 1933	Tuscaloosa	Alabama	Active	
**Austin, TX**		March 1933	Austin	Texas	Active	
Winnipeg, MB		April 9, 1933 – June 1968	Winnipeg	Manitoba	Inactive	
**Ocala, FL**		September 1933–May 1939; April 1948	Ocala	Florida	Active	
Evanston, IL Evening		1934–1949	Evanston	Illinois	Inactive	
Canton, OH		January 1934	Canton	Ohio	Inactive	
Cleveland East Side		April 1934	Cleveland	Ohio	Consolidated	(Note: Merged into Cleveland, OH.)
**New Orleans, LA**		October 1934	New Orleans	Louisiana	Active	(Note: Absorbed Metairie, LA in 1972.)
Georgetown, TX		October 20, 1934 – 1959; 1968	Georgetown	Texas	Inactive	
**Baton Rouge Tri Delta**		November 1934	Baton Rouge	Louisiana	Active	
Paragould, AR		November 1934–March 1937	Paragould	Arkansas	Inactive	
**San Francisco, CA**		November 6, 1934	San Francisco	California	Active	
Taylor, TX		November 30, 1934 – June 1939	Taylor	Texas	Inactive	
**Bangor, Maine**		1935	Bangor	Maine	Active	
**El Paso, TX**		1935	El Paso	Texas	Active	
Long Beach, CA		1935–July 1975; January 5, 1979	Long Beach	California	Inactive	
**Orlando/Winter Park, FL**		1935–1938; March 20, 1943	Orlando and Winter Park	Florida	Active	(Note: Chapter chartered as Orlando, FL. It added Winter Park in 1963.)
Peoria, IL		1935	Peoria	Illinois	Inactive	
**Shreveport, LA**		January 11, 1935 – 1940; February 16, 1943	Shreveport	Louisiana	Active	
Gainesville, GA		February 1935 – August 6, 1977	Gainesville	Georgia	Inactive	
Akron, OH		March 1935	Akron	Ohio	Inactive	
**Buffalo Area, NY**		March 1935	Buffalo	New York	Active	
Cameron, TX		March 1935–January 1937		Texas	Active	
Central Missouri		March 1935	Columbia	Missouri	Inactive	(Note: Chapter was called Columbia, MO until 1948.)
Connorville, IN		March 1935 – 1937	Connorville	Indiana	Inactive	
Flint, MI		March 1935 – 1940; 1948	Flint	Michigan	Inactive	
**Fort Smith, AR**		March 1935 – 1942; January 25, 1949	Fort Smith	Arkansas	Active	
Hutchinson, KS		March 1935	Hutchinson	Kansas	Inactive	
Jackson, MS		March 1935 – 1942; 1948	Jackson	Mississippi	Inactive	
**Northern New Jersey**		March 1935	Montclair	New Jersey	Active	(Note: Chapter was called Montclair/Northern, NJ from 1952 to 1960.)
Palo Alto, CA		March 1935 – 1939; March 1953	Palo Alto	California	Inactive	(Note: Pala Alto was part of the Stanford alumnae chapter until 1929.)
**Boise, ID**		May 1935	Boise	Idaho	Active	
**Tampa, FL**		May 16, 1935	Tampa	Florida	Active	
**Richmond, VA**		June 6, 1935 – 1942; 1948	Richmond	Virginia	Active	
Temple, TX		November 1935–June 1939	Temple	Texas	Inactive	(Note: Chapter reformed as Temple/Belton, TX in 1983.)
Westchester, NY		November 1935	Westchester County	New York	Inactive	
Middletown, OH		1936–1942; 1953–1984	Middletown	Ohio	Inactive	
Youngstown, OH		February 10, 1936	Youngstown	Ohio	Inactive	
Edmonton, AB		March 1936 – October 1, 1960	Edmonton	Alberta	Inactive	
**Chicago NW Suburban, IL**		April 20, 1936	Chicago	Illinois	Active	
Great Falls, MT		May 1936	Great Falls	Montana	Inactive	
Toronto, ON		December 4, 1936	Toronto	Ontario	Inactive	
**Louisville, KY**		December 15, 1936 – May 1945; April 1949	Louisville	Kentucky	Active	
Cheyenne, WY		November 26, 1937	Cheyenne	Wyoming	Inactive	
**Yakima, WA**		December 1937	Yakima	Washington	Active	
**Greater Hartford, CT**		1938	Hartford	Connecticut	Active	
Hartford, CT		April 1938	Hartford	Connecticut	Inactive	
Southern Maine		May 1938	Portland	Maine	Inactive	(Note: Chapter was chartered as Portland, ME. Its name changed in 1978.)
Southeastern, OH		November 1938–February 1952		Ohio	Inactive	
**Toronto, ON**		December 4, 1936	Toronto	Ontario, Canada	Active	
North Indiana		1939–1951		Indiana	Consolidated	(Note: Chapter merged with Fort Wayne, IN for Northeast Indiana/Fort Wayne, IN in 1951.)
**Long Island, NY**		January 1939	Long Island	New York	Active	
**Waco, TX**		January 1939–January 1958; January 1959	Waco	Texas	Active	
Greenwood, MS		March 1939 – 1956; May 1978	Greenwood	Mississippi	Inactive	(Note: Chapter was part of South Delta, MS from 1957 to 1978)
**Tucson, AZ**		1940	Tucson	Arizona	Active	
South Bend/Mishawaka, IN		May 1940–March 1942; August 1, 1953 – xxxx ?	South Bend and Mishawaka	Indiana	Inactive	(Note: Chapter operated as South Bend from 1940 to 1942. It reformed as South Bend/Mishawaka, IN.)
**Sacramento**		May 1940	Sacramento	California	Active	
**Hawaii**		March 1941 – October 11, 1978; November 9, 1984	Honolulu	Hawaii	Active	(Note: Chapter was called Honolulu, HI until 1978.)
**Gainesville, FL**		October 1942–May 1945; February 1948	Gainesville	Florida	Active	
**Beaumont, TX**		January 13, 1943	Beaumont	Texas	Active	(Note: Absorbed Port Arthur, TX chapter in March 1987.)
Davenport, IA		1944–1946	Davenport	Iowa	Inactive	
Muncie, IN		October 1945 – 1954; August 3, 1964	Muncie	Indiana	Inactive	
Ventura/Santa Barbara, CA		October 1945–June 1957	Ventura and Santa Barbara	California	Inactive	(Note: Chapter split into Ventura County and Santa Barbara.)
Bloomington, IN		March 30, 1946	Bloomington	Indiana	Inactive	
**Albuquerque, NM**		1947	Albuquerque	New Mexico	Active	
**Lawrence, KS**		1947	Lawrence	Kansas	Active	
San Bernardino, CA		1947–March 1972	San Benardino	California	Inactive	
**Boulder, CO Tri Delta**		January 15, 1947	Boulder	Colorado	Active	
Corvallis, OR		March 1947	Carvallis	Oregon	Inactive	
Glendale, CA		August 7, 1947	Glendale	California	Inactive	(Note: This chapter originally included Burbank, Eagle Rock, La Canada, La Crescenta, Montrose, Silver Lake, and Sunland, Tujunga.)
Northern/Aroostook, ME		March 1947–August 1953	Aroostook County	Maine	Inactive	
Fresco, CA		August 16, 1947	Fresno	California	Inactive	
**Missoula, MT**		October 1947	Missoula	Montana	Active	
Lansing/East Langsing, MI		November 1947	Lansing	Michigan	Inactive	
**Meridian, MS**		November 11, 1947	Meridian	Mississippi	Active	
**Fairfield County, CT**		1948–April 1953; August 5, 1957	Fairfield County	Connecticut	Active	(Note: Chapter was formerly South Fairfield County, CO.)
**Wilmington, DE**		January 1948	Wilmington	Delaware	Active	
**Corpus Christi/Coastal Bend, TX**		February 12, 1948	Corpus Christi	Texas	Active	
Central Kentucky		March 1948–May 1950; August 1, 1979		Kentucky	Inactive	
**San Jose, CA**		March 3, 1948	San Jose	California	Active	
**Charlotte, NC**		May 1948	Charlotte	North Carolina	Active	
**Grand Forks, ND**		May 1948	Grand Forks	North Dakota	Active	
Haines City, FL		May 1948 – 1953	Haines City	Florida	Inactive	
McCook, NE		October 1948–January 1950	McCook	Nebraska	Inactive	
**Montgomery, AL**		October 22, 1948	Montgomery	Alabama	Active	
Peninsula, CA		November 6, 1948		California	Inactive	
Casper, WY		1949	Casper	Wyoming	Inactive	
Joliet, IL		1949	Joliet	Illinois	Inactive	
**Midland, TX**		1949	Midland	Texas	Active	
Rush County, IN		1949–1957	Rush County	Indiana	Inactive	
**Topeka, KS**		January 17, 1949	Topeka	Kansas	Active	
Westfield, NJ		February 1949	Westfield	New Jersey	Inactive	(Note: Chapter formed from Northern New Jersey.)
**Bryan/College Station Area, TX**		March 1949	Bryan and College Station	Texas	Active	(Note: Chapter was called Brazos Valley from 1982 to 1987.)
**Huntsville, AL**		April 4, 1949	Huntsville	Alabama	Active	
Chicago/Beverly South Shore, IL		May 1949 – March 27, 1978		Illinois	Inactive	
Duluth, MN		May 1949–June 1963	Duluth	Minnesota	Inactive	
Durham, NC		May 1949–May 1965	Durham	North Carolina	Consolidated	(Note: Merged with Raleigh, NC to form Raleigh/Durham/Chapel Hill, NC)
Grand Rapids, MI		May 1949	Grand Rapids	Michigan	Inactive	
**Hattiesburg, MS**		August 6, 1949	Hattiesburg	Mississippi	Active	
Terre Haute, IN		1950	Terre Haute	Indiana	Inactive	
Western Kentucky		1950–February 1952		Kentucky	Inactive	
Whittier Area, CA		1950	Whittier	California	Inactive	
Evansville, IN		May 1950	Evansville	Indiana	Inactive	
**San Fernando Valley, CA**		June 1950	San Fernando Valley	California	Active	
Appleton, WI		September 1950–October 1953	Appleton	Wisconsin	Inactive	
San Luis Obispo, CA		September 6, 1950 – April 19, 1969	San Luis Obispo	California	Inactive	
Elmhurst, IL		October 1950	Elmhurst	Illinois	Inactive	
**Monroe, LA**		October 1950	Monroe	Louisiana	Active	
Olympia, WA		October 1950 – 1961; December 1967	Olympia	Washington	Inactive	
Orange County, CA		October 1950–March 1952	Orange County	California	Inactive	(Note: Chapter was chartered as Santa Ana.)
Pioneer Valley, MA		October 1950–September 1952	Pioneer Valley	Massachusetts	Consolidated	(Note: Chapter merged into Springfield, MA.)
**Fort Lauderdale/Broward County, FL**		November 29, 1950	Fort Lauderdale	Florida	Active	
Rogue Valley, OR		October 1950–June 1951	Rogue Valley	Oregon	Inactive	
Billings, MT		1951–May 1965	Billings	Montana	Inactive	
Northeast Indiana/Fort Wayne, IN		1951 – October 25, 1983	Fort Wayne	Indiana	Moved	(Note: Chapter formed from the Fort Wayne, IN chapter. It later reverted to that name.)
**Tallahassee, FL**		February 23, 1951	Tallahassee	Florida	Active	
Butte, MT		March 1951–September 1954	Butte	Montana	Inactive	
Vancouver, BC		March 1951–January 1972	Vancouver	British Columbia	Inactive	
Evanston/Northshore, IL		April 1951–June 1972	Evanston	Illinois	Consolidated	(Note: Chapter was chartered as North Shore, IL. It absorbed Evanston, IL in 1958. In 1972, it became North Shore/Glenbrook.)
Enid, OK		May 1951	Enid	Oklahoma	Inactive	
Idaho Falls, ID		May 1951–June 1954	Idaho Falls	Idaho	Inactive	
St. Petersburg, FL		May 1951	St. Petersburg	Florida	Inactive	
Battle Creek, MI		August 7, 1951 – November 3, 1975	Battle Creek	Michigan	Inactive	
Paris (Bourbon County), KY		August 24, 1951 – September 1953	Paris	Kentucky	Inactive	
Armarillo, TX		September 1951	Armarillo	Texas	Inactive	
Montreal, QC		September 1951 – 1954	Montreal	Quebec	Inactive	
Medford, OR		October 1951–November 1952	Medford	Oregon	Inactive	
**South Bay, CA**		October 1951	El Segundo to San Pedro, Los Angeles	California	Active	(Note: Chapter was called South Bay/Manhattan Beach until 1981.)
Twin Falls, ID		October 1951–June 1954	Twin Falls	Idaho	Inactive	
Elkhart, IN		November 1951 – 1953	Elkhart	Indiana	Inactive	
Thomasville, GA		December 1951–February 1960	Thomasville	Georgia	Inactive	
Texarkana, AR		December 31, 1951 – 1954; August 1, 1954	Texarkana	Arkansas	Inactive	
Danville, KY		February 1952–May 1957	Danville	Kentucky	Inactive	
Selma, AL		March 1952–June 1957	Selma	Alabama	Inactive	
Bergen County, NJ		May 1952	Bergen County	New Jersey	Inactive	(Note: Chapter was called Englwood, NJ from 1952 to 1954 and Ridgewood, NJ from 1954 to 1965.)
Delaware, OH		May 15, 1952 – November 1956	Delaware	Ohio	Inactive	
**Lubbock, TX**		August 29, 1952	Lubbock	Texas	Active	
Birmingham, MI		September 1952	Birmingham	Michigan	Inactive	
Springfield, MA		September 1952–January 1957	Springfield	Massachusetts	Inactive	
**Metro Detroit, MI**		September 1, 1952	Detroit	Michigan	Active	(Note: Chapter was originally called the Birmingham Alumnae chapter.)
**Phoenix Valley, AZ**		September 1, 1952	Phoenix	Arizona	Active	
College Park, MD		September 8, 1952 – November 1958	College Park	Maryland	Inactive	
Northern Virginia, VA		September 8, 1952 – 2016	Arlington	Virginia	Consolidated	(Note: Chapter formed from the Washington, D.C. and was called Arlington (Northern Virginia) Alliance of Delta Delta Delta. In 1956, it became the Arlington (Northern Virginia) Alumnae Chapter. In 1981, it became the Northern Virginia, VA chapter. In 2016, it merged with the Washington, D.C. to form the Washington, D.C. Metro.)
Joplin, MO		October 1952	Joplin	Missouri	Inactive	
Belleville, IL		October 1952–April 1975; April 1977	Belleville	Illinois	Inactive	
**Prescott, AZ**		March 17, 1953	Prescott	Arizona	Active	
Palm Beach, FL		March 27, 1953 – April 7, 1969	Palm Beach	Florida	Inactive	
Westchester, CA		August 3, 1953	Westchester, Los Angeles	California	Inactive	
Pensacola, FL		August 21, 1953	Pensacola	Florida	Inactive	
**Tyler, TX**		August 28, 1953	Tyler	Texas	Active	(Note: Absorbed East, TX in 1960.)
**Riverside Inland Empire, CA**		October 12, 1953 –April 14, 1971; February 1975	Riverside County	California	Active	
Vancouver, WA		November 30, 1953 – 1957; June 12, 1961	Vancouver	Washington	Inactive	
Tillamook, MA		December 23, 1953 – September 1956	Tillamook	Oregon	Inactive	
Eau Claire, WI		1954–September 1957	Eau Claire	Wisconsin	Inactive	
**Bakersfield, CA**		February 1954–June 1960; September 1962	Bakersfield	California	Active	
Southwest Oklahoma		February 10, 1954 – December 7, 1965	Altus	Oklahoma	Inactive	
**Wichita Falls, TX**		February 24, 1954	Wichita Falls	Texas	Active	
Columbus, GA		May 1954–September 1959	Columbus	Georgia	Inactive	
Pawhuska, OK		May 1954–October 1956	Pawhuska	Oklahoma	Inactive	
Glenview/Skokie Valley, IL		August 1954–May 1972	Glenview	Illinois	Inactive	
Juneau, AK		August 1, 1954 – October 1958	Juneau	Alaska	Inactive	
**Rio Grande Valley, TX**		August 6, 1954 – 1963; March 23, 1968	Rio Grande Valley	Texas	Active	
Anderson, IN		September 1954–May 1964; April 1977–xxxx ?	Anderson	Indiana	Inactive	
**Auburn/East Alabama, AL**		September 1954–September 1956; May 1959	Auburn	Alabama	Active	(Note: Chapter was previously called Auburn/Opelika.)
**Marin County, CA**		September 1954	Marin County	California	Active	(Note: Chapter was called San Rafael/Marin County from 1957 to 1969.)
**Moscow, ID**		October 1954 – October 24, 1975; xxxx ?	Moscow	Idaho	Active	
Roswell, NM		October 1954	Roswell	New Mexico	Inactive	
Salem, OR		October 1954	Salem	Oregon	Inactive	
**Abilene, TX**		November 1954	Abilene	Texas	Active	
Macon, GA (Middle Georgia)		November 1954	Macon	Georgia	Inactive	
Salina/Abiline, KS		November 1954	Salina and Abiline	Kansas	Inactive	
Columbus, IN		1955	Columbus	Indiana	Inactive	
**Gulf Coast, MS**		1955	Mississippi Gulf Coast	Mississippi	Active	
Lake Charles, LA		1955	Lake Charles	Louisiana	Inactive	
Morgantown, WV		1955	Morgantown	West Virginia	Inactive	
**Quad City Area, IA**		February 7, 1955	Quad Cities	Iowa and Illinois	Active	(Note: When chartered, the chapter included Bettendorf and Davenport in Iowa and Moline and East Moline in Illinois. Rock Island, Illinois joined it in 1955.)
**San Angelo, TX**		February 7, 1955	San Angelo	Texas	Active	
**Odessa, TX**		April 4, 1955	Odessa	Texas	Active	
Kokomo, IN		May 1955–November 1961	Kokomo	Indiana	Inactive	
Camden/Eldorado, AR		September 1955–May 1957	Camden and Eldorado	Arkansas	Inactive	
Oak Park, IL		September 1955–June 1959	Oak Park	Illinois	Inactive	
Pine Bluff, AR		September 1955–December 1966; October 1970 – February 24, 1972	Pine Bluff	Arkansas	Inactive	
Leesburg, FL		October 28, 1955 – March 18, 1971	Leesburg	Florida	Inactive	
Richmond, IN		September 1955	Richmond	Indiana	Inactive	
Mansfield, OH		October 21, 1955 – March 1960	Mansfield	Ohio	Inactive	
**Mount Diablo, CA**		January 1956	Mount Diablo	California	Active	(Note: Chapter includes Arinda, Concord, Danville, Lafayette, Moraga, and Walnut Creek. It absorbed the East Bay alumnae chapter in 1986.)
Brady, TX		February 1956–June 1957	Brady	Texas	Inactive	
Lufkin, TX		March 5, 1956 – 1968	Lufkin	Texas	Consolidated	(Note: Merged with Nacogdoches, TX chapters in 1968.)
Williamsburg, VA		April 10, 1956 – May 20, 1959; November 9, 1972	Williamsburg	Virginia	Inactive	
Fremont, NE		May 1956–September 1957	Fremont	Nebraska	Inactive	
Panama City, FL		August 28, 1956 – 1965; September 1970	Panama City	Florida	Inactive	
Burlington, IA		September 1956 – February 10, 1970	Burlington	Iowa	Inactive	
Grand Island, NE		September 1956–October 1960	Grand Island	Nebraska	Inactive	(Note: Chapter was called Grand Island (Central Nebraska) in 1960.)
Hopkinsville, KY		September 1956	Hopkinsville	Kentucky	Inactive	
Huntington, NY		September 1956	Huntington	New York	Inactive	
**Overlake, WA**		October 11, 1956	Overlake	Washington	Active	
Muskogee, OK		November 1956	Muskogee	Oklahoma	Inactive	
Beckley, WV		November 12, 1956	Beckley	West Virginia	Inactive	
Waterloo, IA		December 4, 1956 – January 17, 1966	Waterloo	Iowa	Inactive	
Clearwater, FL		August 1, 1957	Clearwater	Florida	Inactive	
Bowling Green, KY		February 1957	Bowling Green	Kentucky	Inactive	
Lake Oswego, OR		February 1957	Lake Oswego	Oregon	Inactive	
Port Arthur, TX		March 25, 1957 – March 1987	Port Arthur	Texas	Consolidated	(Note: Chapter consolidated with Beaumont, TX.)
**Santa Barbara, CA**		June 7, 1957	Santa Barbara	California	Active	(Note: Chapter was formerly part of the Ventura/Santa Barbara, CA chapter.)
Ventura County, CA		June 11, 1957	Ventura County	California	Inactive	(Note: Chapter formed from Ventura/Santa Barbara, CA chapter.)
Blytheville, AR		August 1, 1957	Blytheville	Arkansas	Inactive	
Caldwell/Nampa, ID		September 1957	Caldwell and Nampa	Idaho	Inactive	
**Athens, GA**		October 1957–June 1959; August 1964	Athens	Georgia	Active	
East Texas		October 1957 – 1960		Texas	Consolidated	(Note: Joined Tyler, TX chapter in 1960.)
Southwest Iowa		October 1957		Iowa	Inactive	(Note: Chapter was originally called Shenandoah, IA)
Pomoma Valley, CA		October 15, 1957 – May 1964	Pomoma Valley	California	Inactive	
**North Delta, MS**		November 1957 – July 31, 1978; xxxx ?	Yazoo–Mississippi Delta	Mississippi	Active	(Note: Chapter was called The Delta from 1956 to 1957.)
Dearborn/Western Wayne County, MI		November 1957	Dearborn	Michigan	Inactive	(Note: Chapter was originally called Dearborn/Down River.)
**Raleigh/Durham/Chapel Hill, NC**		December 11, 1957 – May 1973; April 28, 1981 – May 24, 1984; xxxx ?	Raleigh, Durham, and Chapel Hill	North Carolina	Active	(Note: Chapter was chartered as Raleigh, NC but later merged with Durham, NC.)
**Rockford Area, IL**		January 1958 – 1986; xxxx ?	Rockford	Illinois	Active	
Whitman County, VA		January 1958–April 1967	Whitman County	Washington	Inactive	
Galveston County, TX		February 8, 1958 – March 29, 1971	Galveston County	Texas	Inactive	
Charleston, WV		March 20, 1958	Charleston	West Virginia	Inactive	
Pampa, TX		March 25, 1958	Pampa	Texas	Inactive	
Calgary, AB		August 1, 1956 – December 2, 1976	Calgary	Alberta	Inactive	
East San Gabriel, CA		August 1958 – June 8, 1967	East San Gabriel	California	Inactive	
Jersey Shore, NJ		August 1958–November 1965	Jersey Shore	New Jersey	Inactive	
Calgary, AB		August 1, 1958 – December 2, 1976	Calgary	Alberta, Canada	Inactive	
**Lafayette, LA**		September 1958	Lafayette	Louisiana	Active	
**Cape Girardeau, MO**		November 1958	Cape Girardeau	Missouri	Active	
Vicksburg, MS		November 1958 – April 15, 1971; February 1985	Vicksburg	Mississippi	Inactive	
Roanoke, VA		November 25, 1958 – April 1963	Roanoke	Virginia	Inactive	
**Colorado Springs, CO**		January 29, 1959	Colorado Springs	Colorado	Active	
**Aurora/Fox Valley, IL**		March 1, 1959	Aurora and Fox Valley	Illinois	Active	(Note: Chapter includes Batavia, Geneva, Oswego, St. Charles, Sandwich, Somonauk, and Yorkville.)
Sherman/Denison, TX		March 27, 1959	Sherman	Texas	Inactive	
Owensboro, KY		April 9, 1959 – July 1973	Owensboro	Kentucky	Inactive	
**Kalamazoo, MI**		June 1959	Kalamazoo	Mississippi	Active	
Logan, UT		June 1959 – May 13, 1976	Logan	Utah	Inactive	
**Flagstaff, AZ**		June 10, 1959	Flagstaff	Arizona	Active	
**Stockton Area, CA**		August 22, 1959	Stockton	California	Active	
North Shore (Long Island), NY		September 1959	North Shore	New York	Inactive	
Northwest Georgia		September 3, 1959 – October 8, 1964		Georgia	Inactive	
Gay, IN		November 18, 1959 – November 12, 1971	Gary	Indiana	Inactive	
Tri Cities, WA		May 1960 – 1965; June 1, 1978	Richland	Washington	Inactive	(Note: Chapter was called Richland, WA until 1965. It now covers Richland, Pasco, and Kennewick.)
**Longview, TX**		May 5, 1960	Longview	Texas	Active	
Vero Beach, FL		May 11, 1960 – April 21, 1976		Florida	Inactive	
**Bartlesville, OK**		June 1960	Bartlesville	Oklahoma	Active	
**Gadsden/Etowah County, AL**		June 20, 1960 – August 1963; November 1968–August 1973; July 5, 1978	Gadsden	Alabama	Active	
Southwestern Georgia		July 25, 1960 – April 1969		Georgia	Inactive	
Lakeland, FL		September 29, 1960 – May 1972	Lakeland	Florida	Inactive	
St. Joseph, MO		November 1960	St. Joseph	Missouri	Inactive	
**Sarasota Area, FL**		November 30, 1960 – August 13, 1973; October 21, 1983	Sarasota	Florida	Active	(Note: Chapter was called Greater Sarasota, FL from 1983 to 1985.)
Winter Haven, FL		December 17, 1960	Winter Haven	Florida	Inactive	
Hampton Roads, VA		1961– April 21, 1978	Hampton Roads	Virginia	Inactive	
Greater Bridgeport, CT		January 16, 1961 – August 4, 1965	Bridgeport	Connecticut	Inactive	
**Dothan, AL**		February 2, 1961	Dothan	Alabama	Active	
Bradenton, FL		February 6, 1961 – August 13, 1973	Bradenton	Florida	Inactive	
**Lawton, OK**		April 1961	Lawton	Oklahoma	Active	
Victoria, TX		April 15, 1961	Victoria	Texas	Inactive	
Wenatchee, WA		April 25, 1961 –October 1964	Wenatchee	Washington	Inactive	
Kansas City, KS		May 1961–March 1974	Kansas City	Kansas	Consolidated	(Note: Consolidated with Kansas City, MO.)
Muscle Shoals, AL		July 20, 1961	Muscle Shoals	Alabama	Inactive	
Quincy, IL		September 15, 1961	Quincy	Illinois	Inactive	
La Crosse, WI		September 21, 1961 – June 1964	La Crosse	Wisconsin	Inactive	
Cocoa/Melbourne, FL		September 28, 1961	Cocoa and Melbourne	Florida	Inactive	
Ogden, UT		November 26, 1961 – July 10, 1977	Ogden	Utah	Inactive	
Monterey Bay, CA		December 14, 1961 – September 26, 1978	Monterey Bay	California	Inactive	
Irving, TX		April 5, 1962	Irving	Texas	Inactive	
**Newport Harbor Area, CA**		April 13, 1962	Newport Beach	California	Active	
Plainview, TX		May 1962–July 1972	Plainview	Texas	Inactive	
Everett, WA		May 2, 1962 – May 4, 1970	Everett	Washington	Inactive	
**North Dallas Area, TX**		May 22, 1962	Richardson	Texas	Active	(Note: Chapter was chartered as the Richardson, TX chapter. Later, it became the Richardson/North Dallas, TX chapter to better reflect the area of its members. In 2010, the chapter merged with the Collin County, TX chapter and became the North Dallas Area, TX chapter.)
Utica, NY		June 4, 1962 – July 1963	Utica	New York	Inactive	
Glen Ellyn/Wheaton, IL		November 1962	Glen Ellyn and Wheaton	Illinois	Inactive	
**Stillwater, OK**		November 1962	Stillwater	Oklahoma	Active	
**Eufaula, AL**		December 5, 1962	Eufaula	Alabama	Active	
Racine, WI		January 15, 1963 – June 19, 1979	Racine	Wisconsin	Inactive	
**Laurel, MS**		May 1963	Laurel	Mississippi	Active	
Midland, MI		May 1963–April 1973	Midland	Michigan	Inactive	
Hamilton, OH		September 1963 – November 20, 1981	Hamilton	Ohio	Consolidated	(Note: Chapter merged with Medina County, OH.)
**Pittsburgh South Suburban, PA**		1964	Pittsburgh	Pennsylvania	Active	
Arcadia, CA		February 1, 1964 – June 8, 1976	Arcadia	California	Inactive	
**Anniston-Talladega, AL**		April 25, 1964 – December 1975; xxxx ?	Anniston and Talladega	Alabama	Active	
Greenwich/Stamford, CT		May 1964 – September 24, 1980	Greenwich and Stamford	Connecticut	Consolidated	(Note: Chapter merged with South Fairfield County, CO which is now Fairfield County, CO.)
West San Fernando Valley, CA		October 8, 1964		California	Inactive	
Danville, IL		November 1964	Danville	Illinois	Inactive	
Calumet Area, IN		January 1965 – 1981	Calumet	Indiana	Moved	(Note: Chapter became Munster-Hammond Area.)
**Arlington, TX**		February 15, 1965	Arlington	Texas	Active	
Ashland, KY		April 20, 1965 – 1977	Ashland	Kentucky	Consolidated	(Note: Joined with Huntington, WV to create the Tri City, KY chapter.)
Helena, AR		September 1965–June 1968	Helena	Arkansas	Inactive	
Monmouth/Ocean City, NJ		October 1965	Ocean City	New Jersey	Inactive	(Note: Chapter was Monmouth County, NJ until 1980.)
Ponca, OK		January 15, 1966 – March 4, 1971	Ponca City	Oklahoma	Inactive	
Palatka, FL		January 16, 1966 – May 25, 1976	Palatka	Florida	Inactive	
Jefferson City, MO		May 1966–August 1973; October 1975	Jefferson City	Missouri	Inactive	
Helena, MT		June 1966–May 1972	Helena	Montana	Inactive	
Sierra Foothills, CA		August 28, 1966 – April 24, 1968		California	Inactive	
**Southern Nevada**		October 1966	Southern Nevada	Nevada	Active	
La Canada, TX		February 3, 1967 – 2005		Texas	Consolidated	(Note: Chapter formed as an expansion of the Glendale, TX chapter. It merged with the San Gabriel-Crescenta Valley chapter.)
Houston/Braes Bayou, TX		February 10, 1967	Houston	Texas	Inactive	
Titusville, FL		March 8, 1967 – July 1977	Titusville	Florida	Inactive	
Fort Walton, FL		April 18, 1967 – January 30, 1968	Fort Walton Beach	Florida	Inactive	
**Denton, TX**		May 4, 1967	Denton	Texas	Active	
Baytown, TX		June 1, 1967	Baytown	Texas	Inactive	
**Greeley, CO**		July 1, 1967	Greeley	Colorado	Active	
**Annapolis, MD**		September 1967–August 1973; xxxx ?	Annapolis	Maryland	Active	(Note: Chapter was previously called Annapolis/Serena Park, MD.)
Mankato, MN		January 3, 1968 – March 1975	Mankato	Minnesota	Inactive	
Decatur, AL		March 23, 1968	Decatur	Alabama	Inactive	
Summit/Morristown, NJ		March 28, 1968 – March 20, 1975	Summit and Morristown	New Jersey	Inactive	
Alexandria, LA		September 1968 – November 15, 1985	Alexandria	Louisiana	Inactive	
**Golden Triangle, MS**		October 29, 1968	Golden Triangle	Mississippi	Active	(Note: Chapter was called Columbus Area, MS until 1972. It includes Columbus, Starkville, and Westpoint.)
Metairie, LA		December 1, 1968 – February 1972	Metairie	Louisiana	Consolidated	(Note: Chapter consolidated with New Orleans, LA.)
Napa Valley, CA		April 7, 1969	Napa Valley	California	Inactive	
**Hot Springs, AR**		May 1, 1969	Hot Springs	Arkansas	Active	
Crowley, LA		May 23, 1969 – November 21, 1978	Crowley	Louisiana	Inactive	
South Shore, NJ		May 1970	Burlington County and Camden County	New Jersey	Inactive	(Note: Chapter was called Burlington/Camden County, NJ until 1984.)
Sunnyvale, CA		May 1970–March 1981	Sunnyvale	California	Consolidated	(Note: Formed from Palo Alto. Merged back into Palo Alto in 1981.)
Greenville, AL		June 1970–March 1980	Greenville	Alabama	Inactive	
Clay/Ray, MO		August 13, 1970 – January 1, 1975	Clay	Missouri	Consolidated	(Note: Chapter merged into Kansas City/Northland, MO.)
**South Indianapolis, IN**		October 1970	Indianapolis	Indiana	Active	
North Central, MS		October 19, 1970 – May 1, 1982		Mississippi	Inactive	
Portland East, OR		1971–1978	Portland	Oregon	Consolidated	
Portland West, OR		1971–1978	Portland	Oregon	Consolidated	
Carrollton, GA		February 18, 1971	Carrollton	Georgia	Inactive	
Elgin Area, IL		April 1971	Elgin	Illinois	Inactive	
Sandusky, OH		April 1972	Sandusky	Ohio	Inactive	
Pullman, WA		June 8, 1972	Pullman	Washington	Inactive	
Diamond Hill, MA		July 20, 1972 – March 1981		Massachusetts and Rhode Island	Inactive	
**Conejo Valley, CA**		August 20, 1972	Conejo Valley	California	Active	
North Shore/Glenbrook, IL		September 1972		Illinois	Inactive	(Note: Chapter formed from Evanston/Northshore, IL.)
Brownwood, TX		June 2, 1973	Brownwood	Texas	Inactive	
Sunflower County, MS		June 27, 1973	Sunflower County	Mississippi	Inactive	
**Western Orange County, CA**		October 10, 1973	Orange County	California	Active	
Winston-Salem/Forsyth County, NC		November 1973	Winston-Salem	North Carolina	Inactive	
Southwest, VA		November 12, 1973 – February 11, 1980	Blacksburg	Virginia	Inactive	
**Southern Orange County, CA**		November 21, 1973	Orange County	California	Active	(Note: Chapter was originally known as Saddleback Valley, TX.)
High Plains/Clovis		April 10, 1974	Clovis	New Mexico	Inactive	
Dubuque, IA		August 1974–September 1983	Dubuque	Iowa	Inactive	
Charlottesville, VA		March 31, 1975	Charlottesville	Virginia	Inactive	
Montgomery, TX		June 1975	Montgomery	Texas	Inactive	(Note: Chapter was called Conroe, TX from 1975-1985.)
Suburban North Indianapolis, IN		August 1, 1975 – October 26, 1983	Indianapolis	Indiana	Inactive	
Olathe, KS		November 3, 1975 – January 1, 1984	Olathe	Kansas	Inactive	
**Kansas City/Northland, MO**		April 12, 1976	Kansas City	Missouri	Active	
Houston/Bay Area, TX		July 22, 1976	Bay Area Houston	Texas	Inactive	
**NW Harris County, TX**		September 2, 1976	Harris County	Texas	Active	
**Eastern Orange County, CA**		October 12, 1976	Orange County	California	Active	
South Delta MS		October 19, 1976		Mississippi	Inactive	(Note: In 1978, Cleveland, MS and Greenwood, MS chapters formed by separating from this chapter.)
Tri-State, KY		1977	Ashland	Kentucky	Inactive	(Note: Chapter formed by the merger of Huntington, WV and Ashland, KY chapters.)
Marianna, FL		May 17, 1977	Marianna	Florida	Inactive	
Medina County, OH		January 10, 1978	Medina County	Ohio	Inactive	(Note: Absorbed Hamilton, OR in 1981.)
East Bay, CA		January 13, 1978 – 1986	East Bay	California	Consolidated	(Note: Chapter merged with Mt. Diablo.)
**Tri Delta Cleveland**		February 24, 1978	Cleveland	Mississippi	Active	(Note: Chapter was formed from South Delta, MS as Cleveland Area, MS.)
Ardmore, OK		March 8, 1978	Ardmore	Oklahoma	Inactive	
Baldy View, CA		April 4, 1978 – April 2, 1984	Upland	California	Inactive	
**Northeast Arkansas**		September 21, 1978	Northeast Arkansas	Arkansas	Active	
Boca Roton, FL		January 25, 1979	Boca Rotan	Florida	Inactive	
Shelby County, KY		February 1979	Shelby County	Kentucky	Inactive	
Santa Fe/Los Alamos, NM		February 12, 1979	Sante Fe and Los Alamos	New Mexico	Inactive	
Brazosport Area, TX		March 19, 1980–September 1983	Lake Jackson	Texas	Inactive	
Texoma, TX		June 15, 1979	Texoma	Texas	Inactive	
Duncan, OK		August 1, 1979	Duncan	Oklahoma	Inactive	
North Georgia		August 22, 1980 – November 13, 1984		Georgia	Inactive	
Houston/Lake Houston Area, TX		October 27, 1980	Houston	Texas	Inactive	
Munster-Hammond, IN		1981	Munster and Hammond	Indiana	Inactive	(Note: Chapter formed from the Calumet Area, IN chapter.)
Bismarck Area, ND		January 24, 1981	Bismarck	North Dakota	Inactive	
Plano, TX		February 5, 1981	Plano	Texas	Inactive	
**Vernon, TX**		March 17, 1981	Vernon	Texas	Active	
Marshall, TX		March 20, 1981	Marshall	Texas	Inactive	
**Springfield, IL**		June 22, 1981	Springfield	Illinois	Active	
San Diego North County, CA		October 13, 1981	San Diego County	California	Inactive	
White River, AR		October 23, 1981	White River	Arkansas	Inactive	
**Canton, MS**		January 21, 1983	Canton	Mississippi	Active	
Bayou Tammany, LA		January 29, 1983 – June 1987	Slidell	Louisiana	Inactive	(Note: Chapter was called Slidell, LA from its charter date until 1984.)
Montgomery County, MD		February 1983–20xx ?	Montgomery County	Maryland	Consolidated	(Note: Chapter formed from the Washington, D.C. chapter and, later, returned merged into that chapter.)
**Temple/Belton, TX**		March 7, 1983	Temple and Belton	Texas	Active	(Note: Chapter formed as Temple, TX and consolidated with Belton, TX in 1983.)
Kansas/Colorado Corner, CO		April 18, 1983		Kansas	Inactive	(Note: Chapter was originally the Kansas alumnae.)
**Fort Myers, FL**		August 1983	Fort Myers	Florida	Active	(Note: Chapter was chartered as Southwest Florida but its name changed the next year. It included Naples until 1987.)
**Stuart Area, FL**		May 4, 1984	Stuart	Florida	Active	
**Yazoo County, MS**		May 10, 1985	Yazoo County	Mississippi	Active	
Hays Area, KS		May 30, 1985	Hays	Kansas	Inactive	
Shawnee, OK		June 6, 1985	Shawnee	Oklahoma	Inactive	
Naperville/Lisle, IL		July 18, 1985		Illinois	Inactive	
New Hampshire Mountains and Lake Region		September 2, 1985		New Hampshire	Inactive	
Southeast Kansas		September 2, 1985		Kansas	Inactive	
Washingtonian, MD		October 28, 1985		Maryland	Inactive	
Hendersonville, NC		February 1, 1986	Hendersonville	North Carolina	Inactive	
Gastonia, NC		July 8, 1986	Gastonia	North Carolina	Inactive	
Katy Area, TX		September 26, 1986	Katy	Texas	Inactive	
Dallas Southern Suburbs		January 24, 1987	Dallas	Texas	Inactive	
Garland, TX		April 27, 1987	Garland	Texas	Inactive	
**Naples Area, FL**		May 17, 1987	Naples	Florida	Active	(Note: Chapter was originally called Naples/Marco Island, FL. It formed by splitting off from the Naples, FL.)
**Northeast Tarrant County, TX**		May 1, 1988	Tarrant County	Texas	Active	
**San Gabriel/Crescenta Valley, CA**		March 10, 2006	San Gabriel and Crescenta Valley	California	Active	
**Washington DC Metro**		2016	Washington	District of Columbia	Active	(Note: Chapter formed from the merger of Northern Virginia, VA and Washington, D.C. chapters.)
**Ruston, LA**		2017	Ruston	Louisiana	Active	
Belton, TX		19xx ?– 1983	Belton	Texas	Consolidated	(Note: Chapter consolidated with Temple, TX to form Temple/Belton, TX in 1983.)
Collin County, TX		xxxx ?– 2010	Collin County	Texas	Consolidated	(Note: Chapter merged with the Richardson/North Dallas, TX chapter to form the North Dallas Area, TX chapter.)
**California Central Coast, CA**			Central Coast	California	Active	
**Chattanooga, TN**			Chattanooga	Tennessee	Active	
**Chicago North Shore, IL**			North Shore	Illinois	Active	(Note: Chapter formed as Chicago Northside.)
**Collierville-Germantown, TN**			Collierville and Germantown	Tennessee	Active	
**Columbia, SC**			Columbia	South Carolina	Active	
**Daytona Beach, FL**			Daytona Beach	Florida	Active	
**Desert Area, CA**			Deserts of California	California	Active	
**Desoto County, MS**			Desoto County	Mississippi	Active	
**DuPage Area, IL**			DuPage County	Illinois	Active	
**Emerald Coast, FL**			Emerald Coast	Florida	Active	
Fargo/Moorhead, ND			Fargo and Moorhead	North Dakota and Minnesota	Inactive	
**Foothills Area, CA**			Sacramento	California	Active	
Fort Bend County, TX			Fort Bend County	Texas	Inactive	
**Fredericksburg Area, VA**			Fredericksburg	Virginia	Active	
**Golden Isles, GA**			Golden Isles	Georgia	Active	
Graham Area, TX			Graham	Texas	Inactive	
**Greensboro, NC**			Greensboro	North Carolina	Active	
**Greenville, SC**			Greenville	South Carolina	Active	
**Heart of Texas, TX**			Heart of Texas	Texas	Active	
**Hill Country, TX**			Hill Country	Texas	Active	
**Jonesboro Area, AR**			Jonesboro, AR	Arkansas	Active	
**Knoxville, TN**			Knoxville	Tennsessee	Active	
**Loudoun County, VA**			Loudoun County	Virginia	Active	
**Low Country, SC**			Lowcountry	South Carolina	Active	
**Lower Hudson Valley, NY**			Hudson Valley	New York	Active	
**McHenry County, IL**			McHenry County	Illinois	Active	
**Memphis, TN**			Memphis	Tennessee	Active	
**Metro Jackson/Central, MS**			Jackson	Mississippi	Active	
**Miami Dade/Keys, FL**			Miami-Dade County and Florida Keys	Florida	Active	
**Mid Willamette Valley, OR**			Willamette Valley	Oregon	Active	
**Monterey Peninsula, CA**			Monterey Peninsula	California	Active	
**Nashville, TN**			Nashville	Tennessee	Active	
**Northwest Arkansas**			Northwest Arkansas	Arkansas	Active	
**Ottawa, ON**			Ottawa	Ontario, Canada	Active	
**Panola/Tate, MS**			Panola County and Tate County	Mississippi	Active	
**Philadelphia Main Line, PA**			Philadelphia	Pennsylvania	Active	
**Polk Co./Winter Haven/Lakeland, FL**			Winter Haven, and Lakeland	Florida	Active	
**Princeton Area, NJ**			Princeton	New Jersey	Active	
St. Augustine, FL			St. Augustine	Florida	Inactive	
Silicon Valley, CA			Silicon Valley	California	Inactive	
Sonoma County, CA			Sonoma County	California	Inactive	
**South Puget Sound, WA**			South Puget Sound	Washington	Active	
**Space Coast, FL**			Space Coast	Florida	Active	
**Starkville, MS**			Starkville	Mississippi	Active	
State College, PA			State College	Pennsylvania	Inactive	
**Tupelo, MS**			Tupelo	Mississippi	Active	
West Georgia Area, GA				Georgia	Inactive	

== See also ==
- List of Delta Delta Delta chapters
