= Weisenstein =

Weisenstein is a surname. Notable people with the surname include:

- Greg Weisenstein (born c. 1947), former President of West Chester University of Pennsylvania
- Yehuda Weisenstein (born 1955), Israeli fencer
