= Knoxville News Sentinel =

Daily newspaper in Knoxville, Tennessee

- The May 2, 2011 front page of Knoxville News Sentinel
- Type: Daily newspaper
- Format: Broadsheet
- Owner: USA Today Co.
- Editor: Joel Christopher
- Founded: 1886; 140 years ago (as The Sentinel)
- Headquarters: 2332 News Sentinel Drive; Knoxville, Tennessee; 37921
- Circulation: 119,172 Daily; 150,147 Sunday (as of 2007)
- OCLC number: 12008657
- Website: knoxnews.com

The Knoxville News Sentinel, also known as Knox News, is a daily newspaper in Knoxville, Tennessee, United States, owned by the USA Today Co.

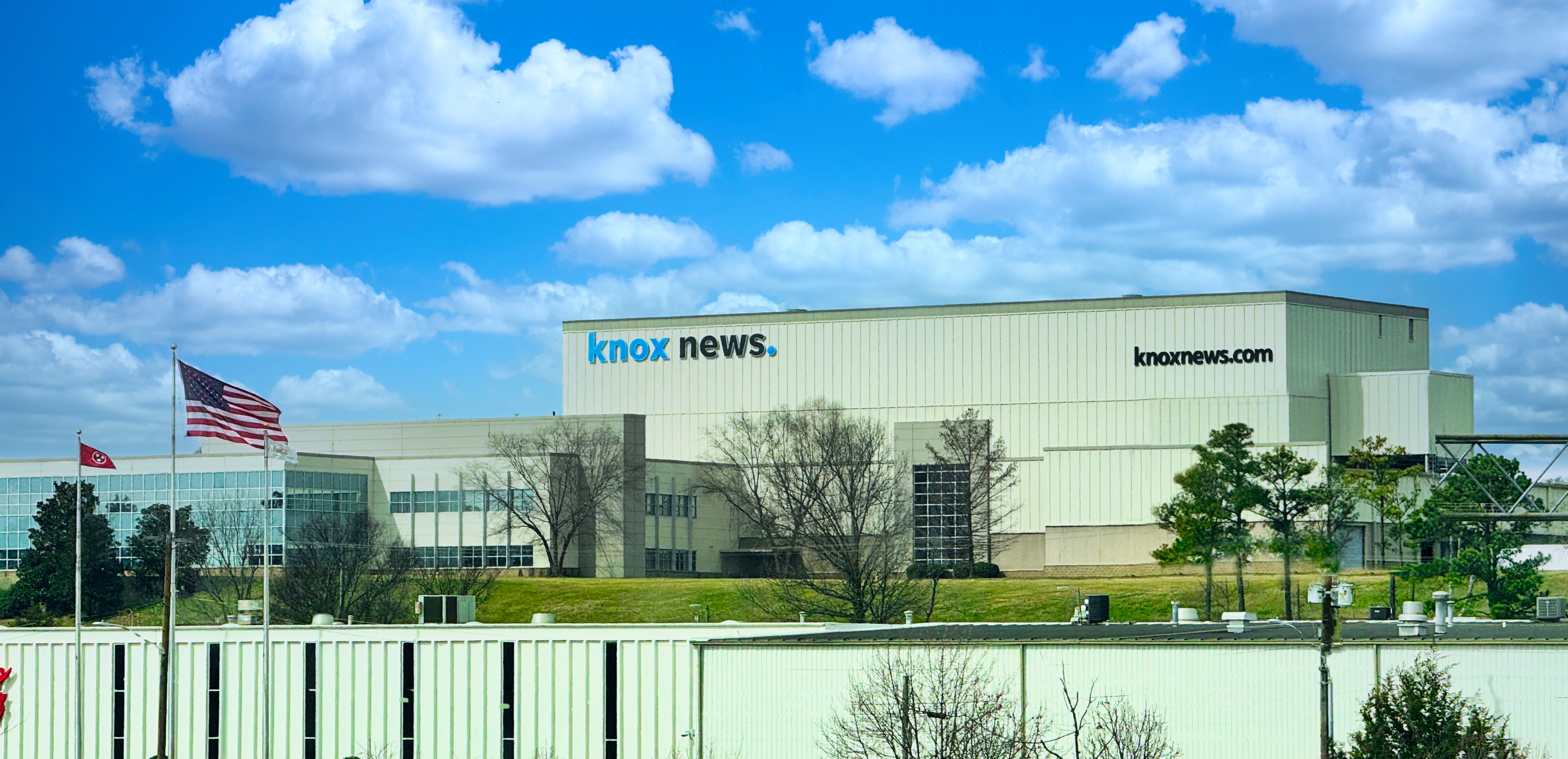
Knoxville News Sentinel headquarters

== History ==
The newspaper was formed in 1926 from the merger of two competing newspapers: The Knoxville News and The Knoxville Sentinel. John Trevis Hearn began publishing The Sentinel in December 1886, while The News was started in 1921 by Robert P. Scripps and Roy W. Howard.

The two merged in 1926 under Scripps-Howard ownership, with the first edition of The Knoxville News-Sentinel appearing on November 22 of that year. The editor from 1921 to 1931, Edward J. Meeman, later was sent to Memphis to edit the since defunct Memphis Press-Scimitar.

In 1986, the News-Sentinel became a morning paper, with the other paper in Knoxville, the Knoxville Journal, becoming an evening paper. The Journal ceased publication as a daily in 1991, when the joint operating agreement between the two papers expired. In 2002, the paper dropped the hyphen from its name to become the Knoxville News Sentinel. It followed Scripps' newspaper holdings into Journal Media Group in 2015.

In April 2016, the News Sentinel announced it had become part of Gannett, as a part of the USA Today Network. This was the result of Gannett's acquisition of Journal Media. The News Sentinel was added to the nation's largest newspaper company with more than 200 local dailies and USA Today.

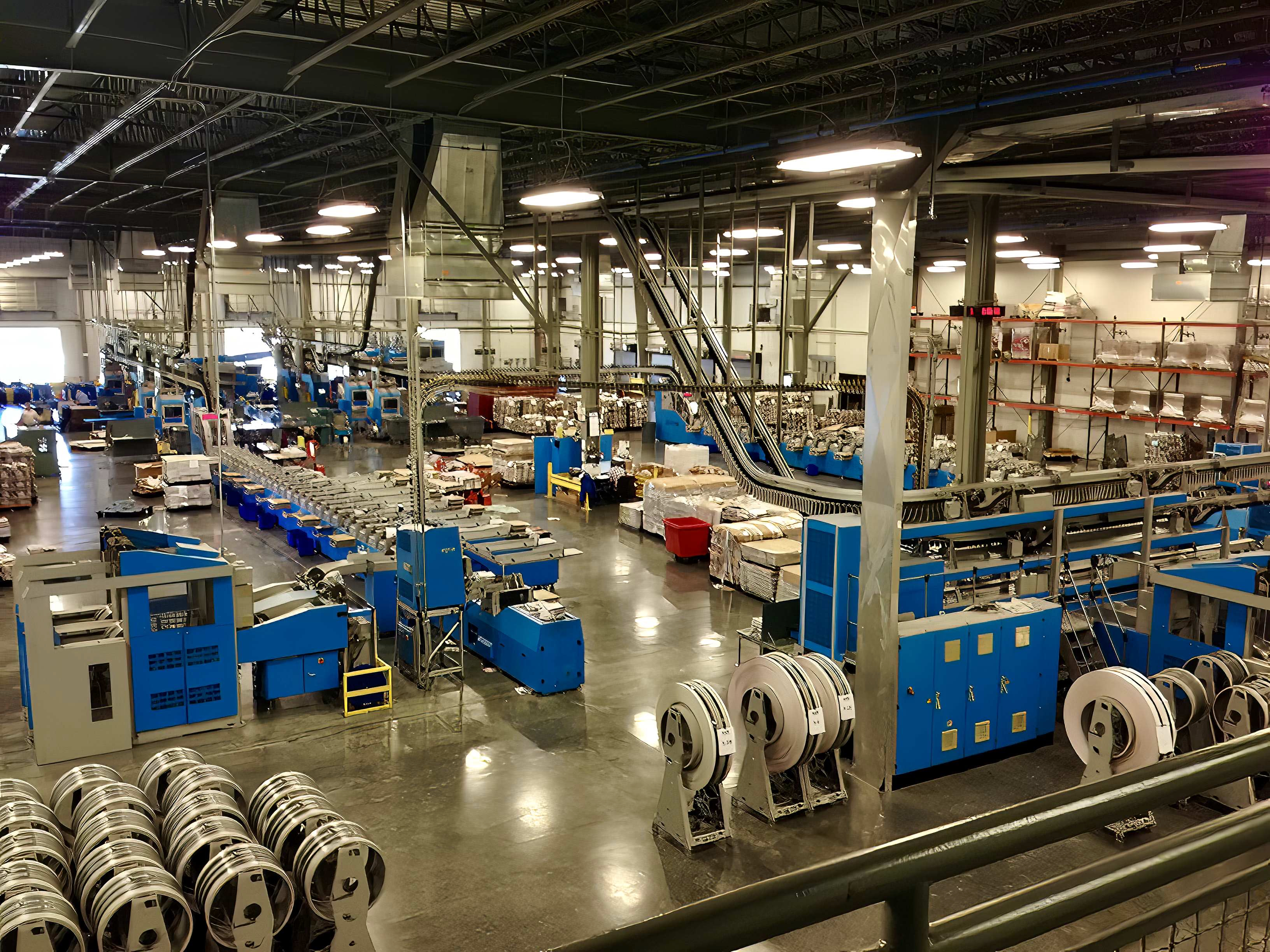
Interior of the Knoxville News Sentinel production facility

== Management ==
Joel Christopher, formerly of Louisville Courier Journal, was appointed the executive editor at Knoxville News Sentinel in January 2019.

Christopher's appointment came after the retirement of executive editor Jack McElroy in early 2019. McElroy, formerly of the Rocky Mountain News served the News Sentinel, as its top editor for 17 years.

Frank E. Rosamond Sr. served as the newspaper's last president after leaving the company with McElroy in 2018.

== Spelling-bee sponsorships ==
The News Sentinel has sponsored four winners of the Scripps National Spelling Bee:

- 1940: Laura Kuykendall (now Laura Kuykendall Mullins) – "therapy"
- 1960: Henry Feldman – "eudaemonic"
- 1963: Glen Van Slyke III – "equipage"
- 1994: Ned Andrews – "antediluvian"

== See also ==
- List of newspapers in Tennessee
