= Madeleine Wing Adler =

American university administrator

Madeline Wing Adler

President of West Chester University
- Succeeded by: Greg Weisenstein

Personal details
- Education: University of Wisconsin, Madison (MS, PhD)
- Alma mater: Northwestern University (BS)

Madeleine Wing Adler is an American retired academic administrator who was the first female president of West Chester University in Pennsylvania.

Adler received a bachelor's degree from Northwestern University and master's degree and Ph.D. in political science from the University of Wisconsin–Madison. Prior to her West Chester University presidency, she held administrative positions at Framingham State College in Massachusetts, the City University of New York, Queens College, and the CUNY Central Office. She has taught at American University and Pennsylvania State University. On May 3, 2007, Adler announced her retirement after serving 15 years at West Chester University.

Adler has served on numerous boards and committees for civic organizations, including Chester County Fund for Women and Girls, the Chester County History Center, and the National Endowment for the Arts/American Canvas. In 1998, Chester County named her its citizen of the year, and the Philadelphia Business Journal named her a Woman of Distinction in 2002.

She is a senior associate at The AASCU-Penson Center for Professional Development, and plans to retire to her family's ancestral seaport town of Sandwich, Massachusetts, on Cape Cod.

== Madeleine Wing Adler Theatre ==
The Madeleine Wing Adler Theatre which opened in 2008, is the newest performing arts venue on the West Chester University campus and has a capacity of 375. It was named in honor of Madeleine Wing Adler in 2008.

== Personal life ==
Adler is a breast cancer survivor and received the Pennsylvania Breast Cancer Coalition's Pink Ribbon Award in 2001.
