= Gayle Jennings-O'Byrne =

American venture capitalist

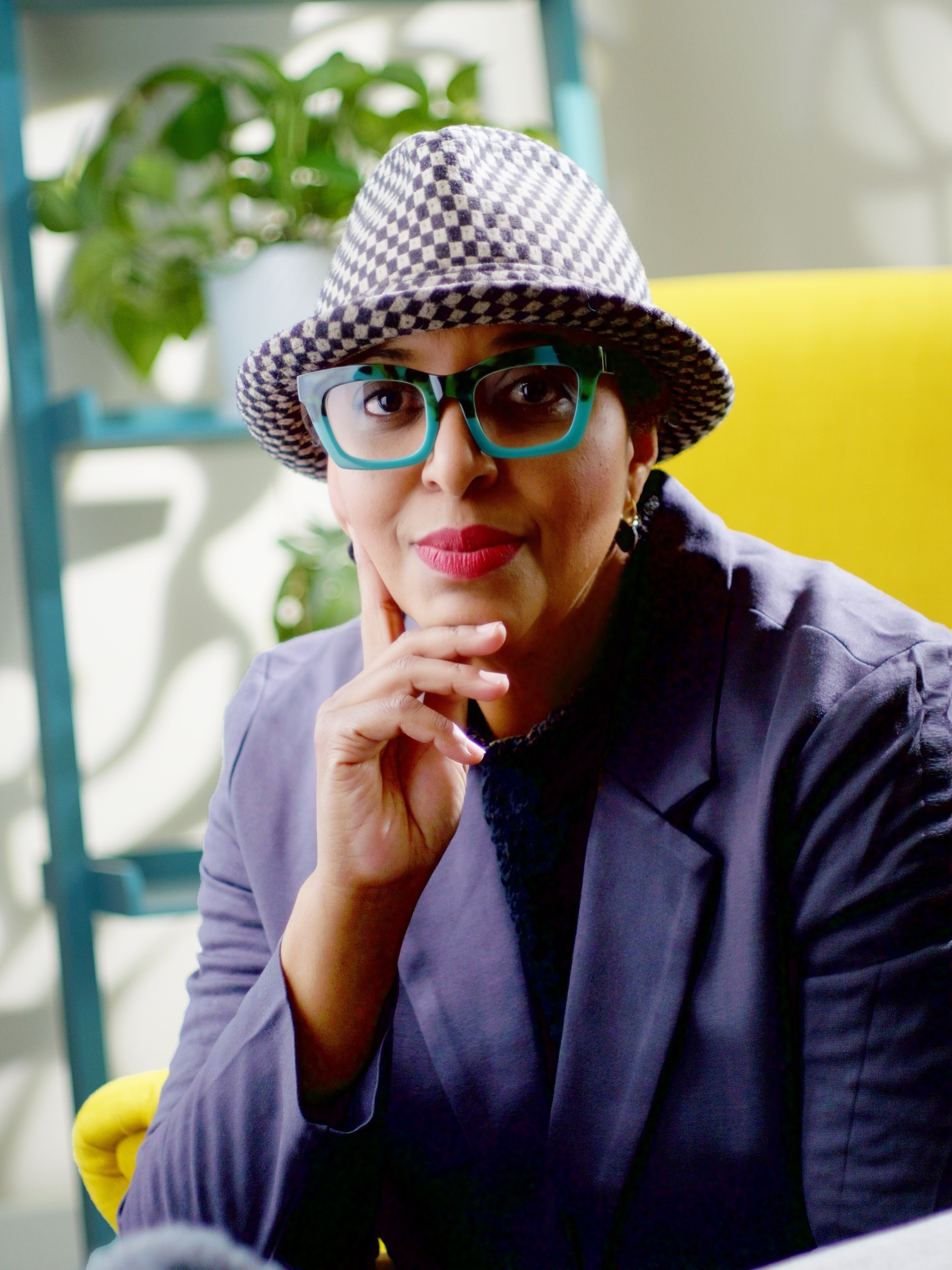
- Born: August 3, 1969 (age 57)
- Education: University of Pennsylvania, The Wharton School, BS, Economics University of Michigan, Stephen M. Ross School of Business MBA, Finance
- Occupation: Venture Capitalist
- Website: wocstar.com

Gayle Jennings-O'Byrne (born August 3, 1969) is a venture capitalist and founder of the Wocstar Fund, a venture capital firm that invests in women of color ("WOC") and diverse inclusive teams in the tech sector. She is best known for her work to empower women of color startups and help build wealth in communities of color and diversity. Her management and consulting company managed the iNTENT Manifesto campaign to mobilize women startups and allies across the globe.

A major funder included JPMorgan Chase and was kicked off with an OpEd in Axios by Jamie Dimon, CEO JPMorgan and Steve Case, CEO Case Foundation.

She has spoken at such summits and forums as United Nations, Aspen Ideas Festival, SXSW, Roadmap to Billions: Black Women Talk Tech, 5th Element Group and has appeared on Sirius XM radio and the NASDAQ TV network discussing the financial markets and the global economic outlook.

== Early life and education ==
Born Gayle Jennings to John Jennings and Thelma (née' Walls) Bataille in St. Louis, Missouri, Jennings-O'Byrne grew up in the Bay Area during the early days of Silicon Valley. Her mother was a trailblazer in computing, beginning with her work on The McDonnell Douglas F-15 fighter jet and the DC-10 and F15 fighter planes as the only female Fortran programmer on the IBM mainframe in the department.

Jennings-O'Byrne attended Justin-Siena High School in Napa, California and subsequently attended The Wharton School of the University of Pennsylvania, to study finance and graduated with a B.S. in economics. She was initiated as a member of Delta Delta Delta and was selected as a 2021 Tri Delta Woman of Achievement. Later she studied at the Ross School of Business at the University of Michigan and received her M.B.A in finance.

== Career ==
Soon after her graduation from Wharton in 1991, Jennings-O'Byrne joined Sun Microsystems as a media relations manager. She introduced and launched a successful initiative that showcased chief information officers and the end-users of the firm's products. Notable projects included Pixar Animation Studios rendering of the movie Toy Story, 1994 World Cup Men's Soccer, global Java rollout and SPARCstation. Upon graduating from Ross School of Business, Jennings-O'Byrne joined JPMorgan Chase's investment bank. She rose to one of only a few female vice presidents in the firm's Mergers and Acquisitions Group. Senior roles in government relations as an international lobbyist and in JPMorgan's Global Philanthropy group followed.

She left JP Morgan Chase and founded Harriet Capital to launch the Harriet Fund, an investment management firm and fund aimed to invest in startups led by Black and Latinx women. In 2018, she pivoted and expanded her vision to include all women of color and relaunched with the iNTENT Manifesto campaign and the Wocstar Fund. Wocstar Capital, is an entrepreneurial advisory, storytelling and investment management firm that educates and trains entrepreneurs and small businesses to build successful/sustainable companies and to access the right capital at the right time.

The Wocstar Fund is an early stage investment fund focused on women of color and inclusive tech founders who are redefining how we will consume, work, play, dwell and socialize in the future. She launched Wocstar Media in 2024.

== Personal life ==
Jennings-O'Byrne married David A O'Byrne, from Dublin, Ireland at Kinnitty Castle in 2004. They have no children.
