= Heart of Texas Council of Governments =

- Logo

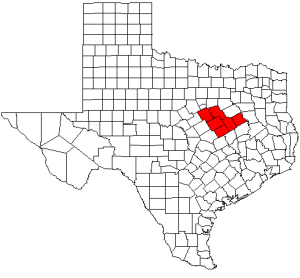
- Map of Texas highlighting counties served by the Heart of Texas Council of Governments
- Formation: May 1966
- Type: Voluntary association of governments
- Region served: 5,611 sq mi (14,530 km^{2})
- Members: 6 counties

Historical population
Year	Pop.	±%
2000	321,536	—
2010	349,273	+8.6%
2020	373,237	+6.9%

The Heart of Texas Council of Governments (HOTCOG) is a voluntary association of cities, counties and special districts in Central Texas.

Based in Waco, the Heart of Texas Council of Governments is a member of the Texas Association of Regional Councils.

== Counties served ==
- Bosque
- Falls
- Freestone
- Hill
- Limestone
- McLennan

== Largest cities in the region ==
- Waco
- Hewitt
- Bellmead
- Woodway
- Robinson
- Marlin
- Mexia
- Lacy-Lakeview
