= List of Delta Delta Delta chapters =

Delta Delta Delta is a North American collegiate women's fraternity. It was founded on November 27, 1888, at Boston University.

== Collegiate chapters ==
In the following list of collegiate chapters, active chapters are indicated in bold and inactive chapters are in italics.

Chapter	Charter date and range	Institution	City	State or province	Status	Ref.
**Alpha**	November 27, 1888 – June 1, 1970; March 31, 1984	Boston University	Boston	Massachusetts	Active	
**Delta**	May 10, 1889	Simpson College	Indianola	Iowa	Active	(Note: Formed by absorbing the local group L.F.V. Sororis, established in 1871.)
**Epsilon**	July 9, 1899	Knox College	Galesburg	Illinois	Active	(Note: Formed by absorbing the local Kappa Beta Theta, established in 1888.)
Gamma	February 22, 1890 – January 1, 1946	Adrian College	Adrian	Michigan	Inactive	
Delta (see **Omega Delta**)	June 1, 1890 – January 1, 1892	Iowa State University	Ames	Iowa	Reinstalled	(Note: Chapter closed due to faculty anti-fraternity policies but was later reinstalled as the Omega Delta chapter.)
**Beta**	December 24, 1891	St. Lawrence University	Canton	New York	Active	
**Zeta**	May 23, 1892	University of Cincinnati	Cincinnati	Ohio	Active	
**Eta**	February 27, 1893	University of Vermont	Burlington	Vermont	Active	
Theta	February 21, 1894 – May 17, 2004	University of Minnesota	Minneapolis	Minnesota	Inactive	
**Iota**	November 1, 1894 – June 1, 1900; May 8, 1915	University of Michigan	Ann Arbor	Michigan	Active	(Note: Reformed in 1915 by absorbing the local group Hilary, established in 1910.)
**Kappa**	November 30, 1894	University of Nebraska–Lincoln	Lincoln	Nebraska	Active	
**Lambda**	March 12, 1895	Baker University	Baldwin City	Kansas	Active	(Note: Formed by absorbing the local Zeta Iota Chi, established in 1890.)
**Sigma**	March 15, 1895 – January 1, 1912	Wesleyan University	Middletown	Connecticut	Active	(Note: Chapter formed by absorbing the local group, A.K.U., established in 1894. It closed when the college stopped accepting women.)
**Upsilon**	June 1, 1895	Northwestern University	Evanston	Illinois	Active	
**Nu**	March 30, 1896	Ohio State University	Columbus	Ohio	Active	
**Omicron**	October 30, 1896	Syracuse University	Syracuse	New York	Active	(Note: Formed by absorbing the local Chi Alpha, established in 1895.)
**Mu**	April 1, 1898	University of Wisconsin–Madison	Madison	Wisconsin	Active	
Xi	November 24, 1898 – January 1, 1942	Goucher College	Baltimore	Maryland	Inactive	(Note: Formed by absorbing the local Tau Delta, established in 1897. All sororities on campus closed with its move to Towsen, Maryland.)
**Pi**	April 14, 1900	University of California, Berkeley	Berkeley	California	Active	
Rho	June 6, 1903 – January 1, 1915	Barnard College	Manhattan, New York City	New York	Inactive	(Note: Chapter formed by absorbing the local group, Question Mark, established in 1901. It closed due to faculty anti-fraternity policies.)
Tau	May 20, 1904 – December 2, 2003	Bucknell University	Lewisburg	Pennsylvania	Inactive	
**Phi**	September 28, 1904	University of Iowa	Iowa City	Iowa	Active	
**Chi**	September 22, 1904 – June 1, 1912; November 20, 1926	University of Mississippi	Oxford	Mississippi	Active	(Note: Chapter formed by absorbing Tau Delta Theta, which was established in 1896. It was closed due to anti-fraternity legislation. It reformed as a colony in 1926.)
**Psi**	September 30, 1904 – April 1, 1970; February 15, 1986	University of Pennsylvania	Philadelphia	Pennsylvania	Active	(Note: Reformed in 1986 by absorbing Psi Delta, established in 1985.)
Alpha Xi	November 29, 1905 – June 1, 1960	Randolph College	Lynchburg	Virginia	Inactive	(Note: Formed by absorbing Delta Delta, established in 1900. Later, absorbed Sigma Sigma Sigma.)
**Beta Zeta**	February 22, 1908	Transylvania University	Lexington	Kentucky	Active	(Note: Formed by absorbing the local Tau Delta, established in 1905.)
Alpha Upsilon	May 14, 1908 – January 1, 1964	Colby College	Waterville	Maine	Inactive	(Note: Formed by absorbing the local Alpha Upsilon, established in 1904. Charter was withdrawn due to changing fraternity policies on campus. All fraternities were banned on campus in 1984.)
Delta Alpha	June 10, 1908 – June 1, 1991	DePauw University	Greencastle	Indiana	Inactive	(Note: Formed by absorbing the local Delta Alpha, established in 1903.)
**Omega**	January 16, 1909 – June 1, 1944; March 9, 1985	Stanford University	Stanford	California	Active	(Note: Chapter formed by absorbing the local Mantiesta Club. It closed due to the college trustee's anti-fraternity policies. It reformed as a colony in 1984.)
**Theta Alpha**	November 8, 1909	University of Washington	Seattle	Washington	Active	(Note: Formed by absorbing the local Delta Rho, established in 1908.)
**Theta Beta**	April 18, 1910	University of Colorado Boulder	Boulder	Colorado	Active	(Note: Formed by absorbing the local Delta Theta, established in 1907.)
**Theta Gamma**	April 25, 1910	University of Oklahoma	Norman	Oklahoma	Active	(Note: Formed by absorbing the local Delta Theta Rho, established in 1909.)
**Theta Delta**	October 21, 1910 – June 15, 2000; June 17, 2009	University of Oregon	Eugene	Oregon	Active	(Note: Formed by absorbing the local club, Kloshe Tillicum, established in 1906. Reformed as a colony in 2010.)
**Delta Beta**	May 27, 1911 – December 14, 2009; November 10, 2013	Miami University	Oxford	Ohio	Active	(Note: Formed by absorbing the local club, Phi Tau, established in 1903.)
**Alpha Alpha**	June 10, 1911	Adelphi University	Garden City	New York	Active	(Note: Formed by absorbing the local Pi Kappa Phi, established in 1908.)
**Delta Gamma**	September 16, 1911	Vanderbilt University	Nashville	Tennessee	Active	(Note: Formed by absorbing the local Theta Delta Theta, established in 1900.)
**Theta Epsilon**	September 30, 1911	Southwestern University	Georgetown	Texas	Active	(Note: Formed by absorbing the local Sigma Sigma Sigma, established in 1903.)
**Theta Zeta**	February 23, 1912	University of Texas at Austin	Austin	Texas	Active	(Note: Formed by absorbing the local Sigma Alpha Chi, established in 1911.)
Delta Delta	March 16, 1912 – January 1, 1915	College of Wooster	Wooster	Ohio	Inactive	(Note: Chapter formed by absorbing the local Delta Sigma Nu, established in 1910. It went inactive due to a fraternity ban by the Board of Trustees. Its successor on campus was Delta Delta Rho (local) which went dormant in 1975.)
**Delta Epsilon**	May 25, 1912	Millikin University	Decatur	Illinois	Active	(Note: Chapter formed by absorbing the local Chi Sigma Phi, established in 1904.)
**Delta Zeta**	August 28, 1912	Franklin College	Franklin	Indiana	Active	(Note: Formed by absorbing the local Alpha Gamma Alpha, established in 1896.)
**Delta Eta**	September 19, 1912	Coe College	Cedar Rapids	Iowa	Active	(Note: Formed by absorbing the local Sigma Sigma Sigma, established in 1899.)
**Omega Delta** (see Delta)	September 21, 1912	Iowa State University	Ames	Iowa	Active	(Note: Reestablished Delta chapter that closed due to faculty anti-fraternity policies. It formed by absorbing the local Omega Delta, established in 1907.)
**Theta Eta**	February 15, 1913	University of Wyoming	Laramie	Wyoming	Active	(Note: Formed by absorbing the local Zeta Xi, established in 1910.)
**Theta Theta**	February 22, 1913	University of Nevada, Reno	Reno	Nevada	Active	(Note: Formed by absorbing the local Theta Epsilon, established in 1901.)
**Alpha Beta**	April 19, 1913	Cornell University	Ithaca	New York	Active	(Note: Formed by absorbing the local group, Sennightly, established in 1895.)
Alpha Gamma	May 17, 1913 – January 1, 1916	Wesleyan College	Macon	Georgia	Inactive	(Note: The chapter formed by absorbing the local Alpha Kappa Psi, established in 1894. In an August 1912 report published in ‘’The Adelphean’’, Ms. Newell Mason, a faculty member at Wesleyan and Historian for Alpha Delta Pi, noted that “College authorities are violently opposed to sororities.” A ten-year battle was fought by several NPC organizations but lost in 1917 when the last members of its four sororities, Alpha Delta Pi, Phi Mu, Zeta Tau Alpha and Delta Delta Delta graduated.)
**Alpha Delta**	May 17, 1913	Stetson University	DeLand	Florida	Active	(Note: Formed by absorbing the local Alpha Kappa Psi, established in 1909.)
Delta Theta	May 26, 1913 – June 1, 1919	Judson College	Marion	Alabama	Inactive	(Note: Formed by absorbing the Theta chapter of Phi Mu Gamma, established in 1904. It closed because of faculty anti-fraternity policies.)
**Delta Iota**	November 14, 1913	University of Arkansas	Fayetteville	Arkansas	Active	(Note: Formed by absorbing the local Alpha Upsilon, established in 1910.)
**Delta Kappa**	November 18, 1913	Drury University	Springfield	Missouri	Active	(Note: Formed by absorbing the local Sigma Lambda, established in 1911.)
**Alpha Epsilon**	May 6, 1914	Brenau University	Gainesville	Georgia	Active	(Note: Chapter began as Sigma Phi Epsilon (local), established in 1905. It became a chapter of Alpha Sigma Alpha in 1909 but withdrew when that fraternity became a pedagogical society in 1913.)
**Delta Lambda**	May 18, 1914 – May 16, 1996; April 9, 2005	Butler University	Indianapolis	Indiana	Active	(Note: Formed by absorbing the local Sigma Delta Zeta, established in 1905. Reformed as a colony in 2004.)
Alpha Zeta	October 26, 1914 – January 1, 1929	Hollins College	Hollins	Virginia	Inactive	(Note: Chapter began as Sigma Sigma Sigma, established in 1905, and released from that national fraternity because it was not located at a teacher's college. In 1913, it merged with Delta Tau Beta (local), established in 1890. The combined chapter joined Tri Delta in 1914, It closed due to faculty anti-fraternity policies.)
**Delta Mu**	November 3, 1914	University of Alabama	Tuscaloosa	Alabama	Active	(Note: Formed by absorbing the local Phi Beta Sigma, established in 1911.)
Delta Nu	November 5, 1914 – April 1, 1989	Mount Union College	Alliance	Ohio	Inactive	(Note: Formed by absorbing Alpha Sigma Alpha (local), established in 1882 as a chapter of Delta Gamma which was released by the fraternity.)
**Delta Xi**	May 15, 1915	University of Missouri	Columbia	Missouri	Active	
**Theta Iota**	June 5, 1915	Kansas State University	Manhattan	Kansas	Active	(Note: Formed by absorbing the local Eta Beta Pi, established in 1907.)
**Theta Kappa**	February 26, 1916	Southern Methodist University	Dallas	Texas	Active	
**Alpha Eta**	March 13, 1916	Florida State University	Tallahassee	Florida	Active	(Note: Formed by absorbing the local Delta Omicron, established in 1914.)
**Alpha Theta**	April 15, 1916	University of Pittsburgh	Pittsburgh	Pennsylvania	Active	(Note: Formed by absorbing the local Alpha Sigma Alpha, established in 1882.)
Alpha Iota	January 13, 1917 – January 1, 1969	Middlebury College	Middlebury	Vermont	Inactive	(Note: Formed by absorbing the Rho chapter of Phi Mu Gamma, established in 1914.)
Theta Lambda	February 10, 1917 – 2022	Colorado State University	Fort Collins	Colorado	Inactive	(Note: Formed by absorbing the local Delta Phi, established in 1913.)
Alpha Kappa	February 17, 1917 – September 4, 2001; December 12, 2016 – 2025	University of Maine	Orono	Maine	Inactive	(Note: Formed by absorbing the local Alpha Kappa, established in 1914.)
Delta Omicron	March 3, 1917 – March 4, 2017	Indiana University Bloomington	Bloomington	Indiana	Inactive	
**Theta Mu**	December 7, 1918	Oregon State University	Corvallis	Oregon	Active	(Note: Formed by absorbing the local Delta Alpha, established in 1915.)
**Theta Nu**	December 14, 1918	Washington State University	Pullman	Washington	Active	(Note: Formed by absorbing the local Sigma Beta Pi, established in 1908.)
**Delta Pi**	May 15, 1920	University of Illinois Urbana-Champaign	Champaign and Urbana	Illinois	Active	(Note: Formed by absorbing the local Chi Theta, established in 1917.)
**Theta Xi**	April 29, 1921	University of Southern California	Los Angeles	California	Active	(Note: Formed by absorbing the local Chi Delta Phi, established in 1916.)
Theta Omicron	January 20, 1923 – May 1, 2005	Whitman College	Walla Walla	Washington	Inactive	(Note: Formed by absorbing the local Sigma Gamma, established in 1919.)
**Delta Rho**	March 16, 1923	University of Kentucky	Lexington	Kentucky	Active	
**Delta Sigma**	October 20, 1923	University of Tennessee	Knoxville	Tennessee	Active	(Note: Formed by absorbing the local Alpha Lambda, established in 1919.)
**Delta Upsilon**	March 28, 1925	Ohio Wesleyan University	Delaware	Ohio	Active	(Note: Formed by absorbing the local Lambda Alpha Sigma, established in 1923.)
Delta Tau	March 7, 1925 – January 1, 1963	Beloit College	Beloit	Wisconsin	Inactive	(Note: Formed by absorbing the local Delta Psi Delta, established in 1908.)
Theta Pi	November 14, 1925 – June 1, 2017	University of California, Los Angeles	Los Angeles	California	Inactive	(Note: Formed by absorbing the local Omega Tau Nu, established in 1922.)
Theta Rho	November 12, 1926 – January 1, 1971	University of Montana	Missoula	Montana	Inactive	(Note: Chapter formed by absorbing the local Phi Beta, established in 1922. It was suspended in 1971 because of internal dissension.)
Delta Phi	November 16, 1926 – January 1, 1954	Washington University	St. Louis	Missouri	Inactive	(Note: Formed by absorbing the local group, Rachivali, established in 1923.)
**Alpha Lambda**	November 28, 1928	University of South Carolina	Columbia	South Carolina	Active	(Note: Formed by absorbing the local Beta Zeta, established in 1927.)
**Alpha Mu**	December 1, 1928	College of William & Mary	Williamsburg	Virginia	Active	(Note: Formed by absorbing the local Delta Chi Delta, established in 1927.)
Theta Sigma	May 25, 1929 – April 30, 2006	University of North Dakota	Grand Forks	North Dakota	Inactive	(Note: Formed by absorbing the local Delta Tau, established in 1923.)
**Theta Tau**	May 25, 1929	University of Idaho	Moscow	Idaho	Active	(Note: Formed by absorbing the local Omega Alpha, established in 1924.)
**Delta Chi**	October 15, 1929	Denison University	Granville	Ohio	Active	(Note: Formed by absorbing the local Sigma Delta Phi, established in 1900.)
**Canada Alpha**	May 25, 1930	University of Toronto	Toronto	Ontario, Canada	Active	(Note: Formed by absorbing the local Kappa Phi Alpha, established in 1921.)
Canada Beta	January 10, 1931 – January 1, 1952	University of Manitoba	Winnipeg	Manitoba, Canada	Inactive	(Note: Formed by absorbing the local Sigma Kappa Ph, established in 1930.)
**Delta Psi**	April 8, 1931	Rhodes College	Memphis	Tennessee	Active	(Note: Formed by absorbing the local Delta Theta Pi, established in 1929.)
**Alpha Nu**	April 12, 1931	College of Charleston	Charleston	South Carolina	Active	(Note: Formed by absorbing the local Sigma Kappa Sigma, established in 1921.)
**Theta Upsilon**	May 9, 1931	University of Tulsa	Tulsa	Oklahoma	Active	(Note: Formed by absorbing the local Delta Gamma, established in 1918.)
Alpha Omicron	November 7, 1931 – 2021	Duke University	Durham	North Carolina	Inactive	(Note: Formed by absorbing the local Delta Chi Upsilon, established in 1930.)
Canada Gamma	February 6, 1932 – January 1, 1959	University of Alberta	Edmonton	Alberta, Canada	Inactive	(Note: Formed by absorbing the local Nu Lambda, established in 1929.)
Theta Phi	March 26, 1932 – May 1, 2006	University of Utah	Salt Lake City	Utah	Inactive	(Note: Formed by absorbing the local Delta Epsilon, established in 1911.)
Theta Chi	April 15, 1933 – January 1, 1938	University of South Dakota	Vermillion	South Dakota	Inactive	(Note: Formed by absorbing the local Beta Alpha, established in 1924.)
**Alpha Pi**	February 3, 1933	University of Maryland, College Park	College Park	Maryland	Active	(Note: Formed by absorbing the local Alpha Upsilon Chi, established in 1926.)
**Delta Omega**	February 27, 1934	Louisiana State University	Baton Rouge	Louisiana	Active	(Note: Formed by absorbing the local Delta Club, established in 1933.)
**Alpha Rho**	March 3, 1934	University of Georgia	Athens	Georgia	Active	
**Alpha Sigma**	September 25, 1943	University of North Carolina at Chapel Hill	Chapel Hill	North Carolina	Active	
Theta Psi	May 7, 1938 – January 1, 1977	University of Texas at El Paso	El Paso	Texas	Inactive	(Note: Formed by absorbing the local Omega Phi Delta, established in 1930.)
**Alpha Tau**	April 15, 1944	Carnegie Mellon University	Pittsburgh	Pennsylvania	Active	(Note: Formed by absorbing the local Alpha Theta Sigma, established in 1932.)
**Phi Alpha**	November 18, 1944	University of Toledo	Toledo	Ohio	Active	(Note: Formed by absorbing the local Psi Chi Phi, established in 1924.)
**Theta Omega**	May 4, 1946	University of Kansas	Lawrence	Kansas	Active	
Phi Beta	October 26, 1946 – June 1, 1984; January 2, 1990 – June 30, 2018	University of Arizona	Tucson	Arizona	Inactive	(Note: Formed by absorbing the local Delta Sigma, established in 1944. Revived as a colony in 1988.)
Alpha Phi	January 18, 1947 – December 4, 2009	Pennsylvania State University	University Park	Pennsylvania	Inactive	(Note: Formed by absorbing the local group, Spoudekast, established in 1945.)
**Alpha Chi**	March 20, 1948 – March 9, 1980; November 6, 1999	University of Miami	Coral Gables	Florida	Active	
**Alpha Psi**	September 11, 1948 – May 8, 1980; November 6, 1999	University of Florida	Gainesville	Florida	Active	
Phi Gamma	May 1, 1948 – September 15, 1992	Michigan State University	East Lansing	Michigan	Inactive	
Phi Delta	May 7, 1949 – August 1, 1990	University of New Mexico	Albuquerque	New Mexico	Inactive	
**Phi Epsilon**	March 31, 1951	University of Southern Mississippi	Hattiesburg	Mississippi	Active	
Phi Zeta	February 7, 1952 – June 1, 1996; February 1, 2017 - 2024	University of Puget Sound	Tacoma	Washington	Inactive	(Note: Formed by absorbing the local Alpha Beta Upsilon, established in 1925.)
**Phi Eta**	April 25, 1953	Texas Tech University	Lubbock	Texas	Active	(Note: Formed by absorbing the local group, D.F.C., established in 1930.)
**Phi Theta**	May 20, 1954	Auburn University	Auburn	Alabama	Active	
Phi Iota	March 3, 1955 – June 1, 1991	West Virginia University	Morgantown	West Virginia	Inactive	
**Phi Kappa**	March 19, 1955	California State University, Long Beach	Long Beach	California	Active	(Note: Formed by absorbing the local Kappa Phi Gamma.)
**Phi Lambda**	April 16, 1955	Texas Christian University	Fort Worth	Texas	Active	
**Phi Mu**	March 23, 1957	Southeast Missouri State University	Cape Girardeau	Missouri	Active	(Note: Formed by absorbing the local Clio Society, established in 1894.)
**Phi Nu**	April 6, 1957	University of Louisiana at Lafayette	Lafayette	Louisiana	Active	(Note: Formed by absorbing the local Delta Sigma Delta, established in 1940.)
**Phi Xi**	June 19, 1957	Wichita State University	Wichita	Kansas	Active	(Note: Formed by absorbing the local group, Sorosis, established in 1897. There was no connection between this early local and the similarly named I.C. Sorosis, a previous name used by Pi Beta Phi.)
**Phi Omicron**	February 25, 1958	Northern Arizona University	Flagstaff	Arizona	Active	(Note: Formed by absorbing the local Alpha Mu Eta, established in the 1920s.)
Phi Pi	January 31, 1959 – January 1, 1974	Utah State University	Logan	Utah	Inactive	(Note: Formed by absorbing the local Zeta Chi, established in 1922.)
**Alpha Omega**	February 8, 1959	Emory University	Atlanta	Georgia	Active	(Note: Formed by absorbing the local Delta Club, established in 1958.)
Phi Rho	September 26, 1959 – June 1, 2019	University of the Pacific	Stockton	California	Inactive	(Note: Formed by absorbing the local Tau Kappa Kappa, established in 1917.)
Phi Sigma	September 22, 1961 – October 15, 1964	Portland State University	Portland	Oregon	Inactive	(Note: Formed by absorbing the local Ami Kai, established in 1951.)
Phi Tau	May 20, 1961 – January 1, 1982	University of Rhode Island	Kingston	Rhode Island	Inactive	
**Phi Phi**	May 19, 1962	Delta State University	Cleveland	Mississippi	Active	(Note: Formed by absorbing the local Chi Delta, established in 1960.)
**Phi Upsilon**	November 15, 1962	Oklahoma State University–Stillwater	Stillwater	Oklahoma	Active	
Phi Chi	January 27, 1962 – August 1, 2005	University of Arkansas at Little Rock	Little Rock	Arkansas	Inactive	(Note: Formed by absorbing the local Tau Sigma, established in 1960.)
Phi Psi	October 24, 1965 – January 1, 1975	Minnesota State University, Mankato	Mankato	Minnesota	Inactive	(Note: Formed by absorbing the local Delta Pi Delta, established in 1961.)
Phi Omega	February 14, 1965 – June 1, 1997	Arizona State University	Tempe	Arizona	Inactive	
**Beta Alpha**	September 16, 1966	University of South Florida	Tampa	Florida	Active	(Note: Formed by absorbing the local Fides Club, established in 1961.)
**Beta Beta**	January 8, 1967	California State University, Northridge	Los Angeles	California	Active	(Note: Formed by absorbing the local Omega Sigma Phi, established in 1961.)
**Beta Gamma**	September 8, 1968	Jacksonville University	Jacksonville	Florida	Active	(Note: Formed by absorbing the local Beta Chi Alpha, established in 1953.)
Beta Delta	February 8, 1968 – May 30, 1985	Indiana State University	Terre Haute	Indiana	Inactive	
**Beta Epsilon**	March 8, 1969	University of Texas at Arlington	Arlington	Texas	Active	(Note: Formed by absorbing the local group, Les Choises, established in 1929.)
**Beta Eta**	May 6, 1969 – January 1, 1984; September 1, 2015	Boise State University	Boise	Idaho	Active	(Note: Formed by absorbing the local Trident Club, established in 1968. Reformed as a colony in 2014.)
**Beta Theta**	January 4, 1970	Clemson University	Clemson	South Carolina	Active	(Note: Formed by absorbing Delta Theta Chi (local), established in 1960.)
Beta Iota	December 6, 1970 – October 14, 2015	University of West Georgia	Carrollton	Georgia	Inactive	(Note: Formed by absorbing the local Phi Sigma Delta, established in 1967.)
Beta Kappa	May 24, 1971 – April 9, 1977	University of North Carolina at Charlotte	Charlotte	North Carolina	Inactive	(Note: Formed by absorbing the local Delta Delta, established in 1969.)
**Beta Lambda**	May 24, 1971	University of Central Florida	Orlando	Florida	Active	(Note: Formed by absorbing the local group, Tri K, established in 1969.)
**Beta Mu**	February 13, 1972	Mississippi State University	Starkville	Mississippi	Active	
**Beta Xi**	December 2, 1972	Stephen F. Austin State University	Nacogdoches	Texas	Active	
**Beta Nu**	May 5, 1973	Virginia Tech	Blacksburg	Virginia	Active	(Note: Formed by absorbing the local Sigma Omicron Nu, established in 1969.)
**Beta Omicron**	January 26, 1974	Illinois State University	Normal	Illinois	Active	(Note: Formed by absorbing the local Theta Phi Upsilon, established in 1968.)
**Beta Pi**	February 2, 1974	University of California, Davis	Davis	California	Active	
Beta Rho	March 1, 1975 – June 1, 1989	Louisiana State University Shreveport	Shreveport	Louisiana	Inactive	(Note: Formed by absorbing the local Omicron Nu Epsilon, established in 1974.)
**Beta Sigma**	September 27, 1975	University of Virginia	Charlottesville	Virginia	Active	(Note: Formed by absorbing the local Zeta Omega Omega, established in 1974.)
**Beta Tau**	August 27, 1977	Baylor University	Waco	Texas	Active	(Note: Formed by absorbing the local Kappa Theta, established in 1938.)
**Beta Upsilon**	March 3, 1979	University of California, Irvine	Irvine	California	Active	
**Beta Phi**	October 14, 1980	Centre College	Danville	Kentucky	Active	
Beta Chi	October 11, 1980 – June 1, 1997	Ball State University	Muncie	Indiana	Inactive	(Note: Formed by absorbing the local Lambda Gamma Nu, established in 1980.)
Beta Psi	May 9, 1981 – February 1, 2018	Union College	Schenectady	New York	Inactive	
Beta Omega	May 8, 1981 – May 9, 1996	Trinity College	Hartford	Connecticut	Inactive	(Note: Formed by absorbing the local Kappa Alpha Phi Theta, established in 1980.)
**Gamma Alpha**	November 7, 1981	Texas A&M University	College Station	Texas	Active	
**Gamma Beta**	February 13, 1982	Villanova University	Villanova	Pennsylvania	Active	
Gamma Gamma	May 8, 1984 – October 23, 2015	Dartmouth College	Hanover	New Hampshire	Inactive	
**Gamma Delta**	October 12, 1985	Spring Hill College	Mobile	Alabama	Active	
Gamma Epsilon	April 5, 1986 – October 5, 2001	Dickinson College	Carlisle	Pennsylvania	Inactive	
**Gamma Zeta**	October 4, 1986	Millsaps College	Jackson	Mississippi	Active	
**Gamma Eta**	May 1, 1987	University of Richmond	Richmond	Virginia	Active	
Gamma Theta	May 9, 1987 – June 14, 2019	University of California, Santa Barbara	Santa Barbara	California	Inactive	
**Gamma Iota**	April 9, 1988	Purdue University	West Lafayette	Indiana	Active	
**Gamma Kappa**	February 11, 1989	Wake Forest University	Winston-Salem	North Carolina	Active	
**Gamma Lambda**	April 8, 1989	University of California, San Diego	San Diego	California	Active	
Gamma Mu	November 4, 1992 – September 2020	Lafayette College	Easton	Pennsylvania	Inactive	(Note: Formed by absorbing the local Gamma Delta Theta, established in 1990.)
Gamma Nu	November 13, 1993 – May 1, 2005	Westminster College	Fulton	Missouri	Inactive	
**Gamma Xi**	March 13, 1994	Furman University	Greenville	South Carolina	Active	(Note: Formed by absorbing the local group Vida, established in 1981.)
**Canada Delta**	March 11, 1995	University of Ottawa	Ottawa	Ontario, Canada	Active	
Gamma Omicron	April 20, 1996 – March 1, 2005	Princeton University	Princeton	New Jersey	Inactive	
**Gamma Pi**	May 4, 1996	Rose–Hulman Institute of Technology	Terre Haute	Indiana	Active	(Note: Formed by absorbing the local S.I.G., established in 1995.)
**Gamma Rho**	October 5, 1996	Pepperdine University	Malibu	California	Active	(Note: Formed by absorbing the local Kappa Psi Delta, established in 1989.)
**Gamma Sigma**	November 23, 1996	Colgate University	Hamilton	New York	Active	
**Gamma Tau**	April 4, 1998	James Madison University	Harrisonburg	Virginia	Active	
Gamma Upsilon	May 2, 1998 – December 16, 2013	Valparaiso University	Valparaiso	Indiana	Inactive	(Note: Formed by absorbing the local Alpha Phi Delta, established in 1918.)
**Gamma Phi**	November 7, 1998	Texas A&M University-Corpus Christi	Corpus Christi	Texas	Active	
**Gamma Chi**	October 28, 2000	University of Denver	Denver	Colorado	Active	
**Gamma Psi**	November 11, 2000	Wofford College	Spartanburg	South Carolina	Active	
**Gamma Omega**	April 12, 2003	Stockton University	Galloway Township	New Jersey	Active	(Note: Formed by absorbing the local Alpha Theta Phi, established in 2001.)
**Epsilon Alpha**	October 25, 2003	Florida Gulf Coast University	Fort Myers	Florida	Active	(Note: Formed by absorbing the local Delta Xi, established in 2001.)
**Epsilon Beta**	April 2, 2005	Lake Forest College	Lake Forest	Illinois	Active	(Note: Formed by absorbing the local Gamma Delta Rho, established in 1961.)
**Epsilon Gamma**	January 29, 2005	Eastern Illinois University	Charleston	Illinois	Active	
**Epsilon Delta**	November 20, 2004	Elon University	Elon	North Carolina	Active	
Epsilon Epsilon	January 8, 2005 – June 4, 2011	California Polytechnic State University, San Luis Obispo	San Luis Obispo	California	Inactive	
Epsilon Zeta	March 18, 2006 – May 1, 2020	Loyola Marymount University	Los Angeles	California	Inactive	
Epsilon Eta	February 1, 2007 – May 14, 2014	North Carolina State University	Raleigh	North Carolina	Inactive	
**Epsilon Theta**	November 10, 2007	University of Texas at Dallas	Richardson	Texas	Active	(Note: Formed by absorbing the local Alpha Lambda Chi, established in 2003.)
**Epsilon Iota**	April 26, 2008	Allegheny College	Meadville	Pennsylvania	Active	
**Epsilon Kappa**	January 31, 2009	University of California, Merced	Merced	California	Active	
**Epsilon Lambda**	February 27, 2010	Towson University	Towson	Maryland	Active	
**Epsilon Mu**	March 27, 2010	Creighton University	Omaha	Nebraska	Active	
**Epsilon Nu**	November 20, 2010	Chapman University	Orange	California	Active	
**Epsilon Xi**	October 4, 2016	Samford University	Homewood	Alabama	Active	
**Epsilon Omicron**	January 4, 2017	North Dakota State University	Fargo	North Dakota	Active	
**Epsilon Pi**	November 19, 2016	Louisiana Tech University	Ruston	Louisiana	Active	
**Epsilon Rho**	November 20, 2016	University of San Francisco	San Francisco	California	Active	
**Epsilon Sigma**	January 28, 2017	Florida Southern College	Lakeland	Florida	Active	
**Epsilon Tau**	November 11, 2017	Quinnipiac University	Hamden	Connecticut	Active	
**Epsilon Upsilon**	April 28, 2018	University of Delaware	Newark	Delaware	Active	
**Epsilon Phi**	August 29, 2019	Temple University	Philadelphia	Pennsylvania	Active	
**Epsilon Chi**	August 29, 2019	Tulane University	New Orleans	Louisiana	Active	
**Epsilon Psi**	October 24, 2020	Sacred Heart University	Fairfield	Connecticut	Active	
