= Greg Weisenstein =

American academic administrator

Greg R. Weisenstein (born c. 1947) is a former president of West Chester University of Pennsylvania. He became West Chester's 14th president on September 25, 2009.

Weisenstein received his bachelor's and master's degrees from the University of Washington, and his doctorate in education from the University of Kansas. He was Dean of the College of Education, Health and Human Development at Montana State University from 1999, then became H Provost and Vice President for Academic Affairs at the University of North Dakota.

Weisenstein has written four books, over 80 articles, and 150 major presentations on scientific and management topics, and has served on four U.S. presidential committees through the Department of Labor. He spent time as an international negotiator and facilitator, negotiating agreements in Western, Central and Eastern Europe. He was the lead negotiator in the agreement reached between the U.S. and former USSR President Gorbachev to serve both countries's educational and scientific communities.

In his October 1, 2015 State of the University address, Weisenstein announced his retirement, which took place on March 21, 2016. He said he wanted to pursue "some other opportunity".
