= Laura Kuykendall =

American college dean

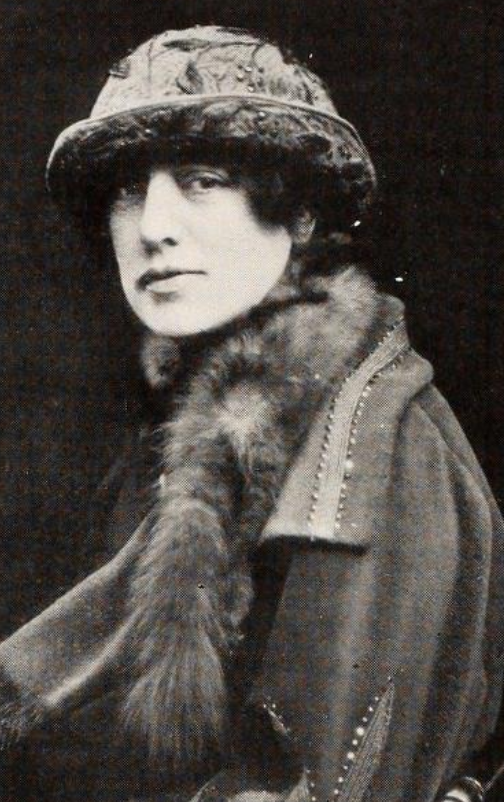
- Laura Kuykendall, from the 1923 yearbook of Southwestern University
- Born: December 18, 1883; Moody, Texas
- Died: April 30, 1935; Georgetown, Texas
- Occupation(s): College professor, college administrator

Laura Lucile Kuykendall (December 18, 1883 – April 30, 1935) was an American college professor and college administrator. She was Dean of Women at Southwestern University in Georgetown, Texas from 1918 to 1935.

== Early life and education ==
Kuykendall was born in Moody, Texas, the daughter of Pierre Moran Kuykendall Sr. and Laura Payne Kuykendall. Her father was a physician; her mother died in 1884, and she was raised by her stepmother, Elinor (Ella) Naylor Kuykendall. She completed her master's degree at Southwestern University in 1926, with a thesis titled "The Dean of Women and Her Problems as Found on a Small University Campus". At Southwestern, she was a member of the Delta Delta Delta sorority.

== Career ==
Kuykendall joined the faculty at Southwestern University, and taught Expression and Physical Training. She was Dean of Women at Southwestern from 1918 to 1935. She was credited with heroic efforts when the women's dormitory burned and no students were harmed. In 1935, the new women's dormitory on campus was named after Kuykendall.

Kuykendall was also known for organizing elaborate campus May Day festivities and other holiday observances, including hundreds of students in her productions. "The May fete is to be the most wonderful production of May time happiness and joy ever witnessed in the South," noted the Houston Post in 1920. "The pageant, under the direction of Miss Laura Kuykendall, will surpass all previous occasions."

== Personal life and legacy ==
Kuykendall died in Georgetown in 1935, after a stroke, at the age of 51. Her funeral was held on campus, and the school's former president conducted her funeral service. Laura Kuykendall Hall was torn down in 1996; the Southwestern campus now has a Laura Kuykendall Garden named in her memory. She is also remembered on campus with the Communication Studies Laura Kuykendall Award.
