= Roosevelt =

Roosevelt most often refers to:

- Theodore Roosevelt (1858–1919, president 1901–1909), 26th president of the United States
- Franklin D. Roosevelt (1882–1945, president 1933–death), 32nd president of the United States
- Eleanor Roosevelt (1884–1962), American activist, first lady of the United States

It may also refer to:

== Education ==
=== United States ===
- Eleanor Roosevelt College, University of California, San Diego
- Roosevelt University, Illinois, a private university with campuses in Chicago and Schaumburg
- Roosevelt High School (disambiguation)
- President Theodore Roosevelt High School, Honolulu, Hawaii
- Roosevelt Junior High School (disambiguation)
- Roosevelt Middle School (disambiguation)
- Roosevelt Elementary School (disambiguation)
- Roosevelt Intermediate School, Westfield, New Jersey
- Roosevelt School (disambiguation), various school buildings on the National Register of Historic Places
- Roosevelt School District (disambiguation)

=== Elsewhere ===
- Roosevelt Institute for American Studies, a research institute and graduate school in Middelburg, the Netherlands, formerly the Roosevelt Study Center
- University College Roosevelt, formerly Roosevelt Academy, Middelburg, the Netherlands

== People and fictional characters ==
- Roosevelt (name)
  - List of people with surname Roosevelt
  - Roosevelt family, U.S. political family
- Roosevelt (given name), a list of people and fictional characters
- Roosevelt (musician), German singer and songwriter Marius Lauber (born 1990)

== Places ==
- Roosevelt Hall (disambiguation)
- Roosevelt Island (disambiguation)
- Lake Roosevelt (disambiguation), also Roosevelt Lake
- Roosevelt Park (disambiguation)

=== United States ===
- Roosevelt, Arizona, a census-designated place
- Roosevelt, Kentucky, an unincorporated community and coal town
- Roosevelt, Minnesota, a city
- Roosevelt, Missouri, an unincorporated community
- Roosevelt, New Jersey, a borough
- Roosevelt, New York, a hamlet and census-designated place
- Roosevelt, Oklahoma, a town
- Roosevelt, Texas (disambiguation)
- Roosevelt, Utah, a city
- Roosevelt, Washington, an unincorporated community and census-designated place
- Roosevelt, Seattle, Washington, a neighborhood of Seattle
- Roosevelt, Wisconsin (disambiguation)
- Roosevelt County, Montana
- Roosevelt County, New Mexico
- Roosevelt Township (disambiguation)
- Roosevelt Glacier, Washington

=== Elsewhere ===
- Roosevelt, Rivadavia Partido, Buenos Aires, Argentina
- Roosevelt River, Brazil
- Roosevelt Campobello International Park, New Brunswick, Canada
- Roosevelt Range, Greenland

== Ships ==
- USS Roosevelt, various United States Navy ships
- SS President Roosevelt, two steamships
- SS Roosevelt (1905), an American steamship

== Sports facilities in the United States ==
- Roosevelt Municipal Golf Course, Los Angeles, California
- Roosevelt Stadium, Jersey City, New Jersey
- Roosevelt Stadium (Union City, New Jersey)
- Roosevelt Raceway, Long Island, New York

== Transportation ==
- Roosevelt Avenue, New York City, United States
- Roosevelt Avenue, Lima, Peru
- Roosevelt Avenue, Quezon City, Philippines, now Fernando Poe Jr. Avenue
- Roosevelt Boulevard (disambiguation)
- Roosevelt Bridge (disambiguation)
- Roosevelt Expressway (disambiguation)
- Roosevelt Highway (disambiguation)
- Roosevelt Road, Chicago, Illinois, United States
- Roosevelt Road (Taipei)
- Roosevelt Station (disambiguation)
- Roosevelt Street, Manhattan, New York, United States
- Roosevelt (automobile), an American automobile manufactured from 1929 to 1930

== Other uses ==
- Roosevelt Hotel (disambiguation)
- Roosevelt & Son, a merchant bank
- Roosevelt Institute, a think tank
- Roosevelt (album), a 2016 album by Roosevelt
- Roosevelt, a 2016 album by The Spinto Band
- Roosevelt Apartment Building, a historic building in Washington D.C., United States
- Roosevelt elk, North America

== See also ==
- Roosevelt's shrew, a mammal
- President Roosevelt (disambiguation)
