= Feels Right =

Feels Right may refer to:

- "Feels Right", a 2016 single by Jocelyn Alice
- "Feels Right", a 2004 song by Lemar from Time to Grow
- "Feels Right", a 2019 song by Carly Rae Jepsen featuring Electric Guest from Dedicated
- "Feels Right", a 2020 song by Biig Piig
- "Feels Right", a 2021 song by Roosevelt from Polydans
- "Feels Right", a 2025 song by Alessia Cara from Love & Hyperbole

== See also ==
- Feel Right (disambiguation)
