= Eleanor Roosevelt (disambiguation) =

Eleanor Roosevelt (1884–1962) was an American politician who served as First Lady of the United States

Eleanor Roosevelt may also refer to:

- Eleanor Butler Roosevelt (1888–1960), philanthropist, and wife of Theodore Roosevelt Jr.
- Eleanor Roosevelt Seagraves (born 1927), American librarian, educator, historian, and editor, granddaughter of the First Lady

== Geography ==
- Eleanor Roosevelt (Hato Rey), a borough of San Juan, Puerto Rico
- Eleanor Roosevelt National Historic Site, an historic site at Val-Kill in Hyde Park, New York

== See also ==
- Eleanor Roosevelt High School (disambiguation)
- Roosevelt Institute
