= Bell-Jeff Invitational =

- Date: Last Saturday in September
- Location: Griffith Park, Los Angeles, California
- Event type: Cross Country
- Distance: 2.8 Miles
- Established: 1973
- Course records: 14:10 (M; 1986 Richard Erbes, Glendale High School); 2011, Bryan Guijarro, Knight High School; 16:31 (F; 2000, Natalie Stein, North Hollywood High School)
- Website: http://bell-jeff.org/

The Bell-Jeff Invitational is an eponymous, annual cross country event hosted by Bellarmine-Jefferson High School in Griffith Park since 1973. Starting early in the morning on the last Saturday in September, the series of races over the course of the day play host to over a hundred different high school cross country teams from across the CIF Southern Section and other sections of the state.

== History ==
The event claims to be the longest continuous running event in Griffith Park. It was started by Bell-Jeff coach Jim Couch who remains the meet director. Over the years, famed runner and coach Laszlo Tabori has helped. Over 3,000 runners participate each year in multiple races. In 2011, the Bell-Jeff Open Race was the start of an Open division race first thing in the morning. That open race is now part of the Southern California USATF Cross Country Grand Prix, attracting adults, coaches and family members to continue in the sport. The start line for the race is named for Paul Suzuki, a long time USATF Official and starter for the race, who was killed in a shot put accident at the 2005 USA Outdoor Track and Field Championships.

== Course ==
The 2.8 mile course starts just outside the Greek Theatre and winds around a set of trails on the west side of North Vermont Canyon Road (the northern portion of Vermont Avenue that leads to the Griffith Observatory) before crossing the street to what is known as "Riverside Canyon" cut into the hillside and leading to "Aberdeen Canyon." The trail drops runners onto Commonwealth Canyon Road, adjacent to the Roosevelt Municipal Golf Course. The course goes west until it reaches the Vermont Tennis Courts, where it takes another trail back to a junction at Riverside Canyon where the race retraces most of the course back to the finish line near the start. There is a 163-meter elevation gain and loss through the course. Being adjacent to Hollywood, there are many movie scenes have been shot on and around the course. The boys course record of 14:10 was set by Richard Erbes of Glendale High School in 1985. It was tied in 2011 by Bryan Guijarro of Pete Knight High School in 2011. The girls course record of 16:31 was set in 2000 by Natalie Stein from North Hollywood High School in 2000.
