= Roosevelt Hall =

Roosevelt Hall may refer to:

- Roosevelt Hall, the Norvelt Fireman's Hall, in Norvelt, Pennsylvania, named for Eleanor Roosevelt.
- Roosevelt Hall (1839), a Greek Revival mansion in Skaneateles, New York.
- Roosevelt Hall, a community center in Barrett, Minnesota, constructed by the Civil Works Administration and on the National Register of Historic Places (NRHP).
- Roosevelt Hall, Eastern Washington Hospital, Medical Lake, Washington, on the NRHP.
- Roosevelt Hall, at Brooklyn College, Brooklyn, New York.
- Roosevelt Hall, at Hofstra University School of Law, Hempstead, New York.
- Roosevelt Hall (1903-07), National War College, Fort McNair, Washington, DC, on the NRHP.
- Roosevelt Hall, at Eastern Michigan University, former Roosevelt High School in Ypsilanti, Michigan

== See also ==
- Hall Roosevelt (1891–1941), American banker and engineer
