= Roosevelt Township, Minnesota =

Roosevelt Township is the name of some places in the U.S. state of Minnesota:

- Roosevelt Township, Beltrami County, Minnesota
- Roosevelt Township, Crow Wing County, Minnesota

== See also ==
- Roosevelt Township (disambiguation)
- Roosevelt, Minnesota
