= Oyola =

Oyola.com.au is a food platform in Australia.

The Spanish surname Oyola may refer to:

People

- Matías Oyola, Argentine footballer
- Ricky Oyola, American skateboarder
- Roosevelt Oyola, Ecuadorian footballer

Other

- ARC Juan Ricardo Oyola Vera, riverine patrol and support vessel of the Colombian Navy
