= List of people with surname Roosevelt =

This is a list of persons with the surname Roosevelt.

== A ==
- Alice Hathaway Lee Roosevelt (1861–1884), first wife of Theodore Roosevelt
- Alice Roosevelt Longworth (1884–1980), socialite, daughter of Theodore Roosevelt
- André Roosevelt (1879–1962), filmmaker
- Anna Roosevelt (disambiguation)
- Archibald Roosevelt (1894–1979), U.S. Army officer
- Archibald Bulloch Roosevelt Jr. (1918–1990), CIA officer

== B ==
- Bamie Roosevelt (1855–1931), sister of Theodore Roosevelt
- Betsey Cushing Roosevelt Whitney (1908–1998), American philanthropist and ex-wife of James Roosevelt
- Blanche Roosevelt (1853–1898), American opera singer and author
- Buddy Roosevelt (1898–1973), American silent film actor and stunt performer

== C ==
- Clinton Roosevelt (1804–1898), Democratic party politician
- Corinne Roosevelt (1861–1933), sister of Theodore Roosevelt
- Cornelius Roosevelt (1794–1871), businessman
- Cornelius V.S. Roosevelt (1915–1991), CIA officer
- Curtis Roosevelt (1930–2014), UN diplomat and writer

== E ==
- Edith Roosevelt (1861–1948), second wife of Theodore Roosevelt
- Eleanor Butler Roosevelt (1888–1960), wife of Theodore Roosevelt Jr.
- Eleanor Roosevelt (1884–1962), First Lady of the United States
- Ellen Roosevelt (1868–1954), tennis player
- Elliott Roosevelt (1910–1990), U.S. Air Force officer, son of Franklin Roosevelt
- Elliott Roosevelt (socialite) (1860–1894), brother of Theodore Roosevelt
- Emlen Roosevelt (1857–1930), banker
- Ethel Roosevelt Derby (1891–1977), daughter of Theodore Roosevelt
- Ethel du Pont Roosevelt (1916–1965), American heiress and wife of Franklin Delano Roosevelt Jr.

== F ==
- Franklin D. Roosevelt (1882–1945), U.S. president
- Franklin Delano Roosevelt Jr. (1914–1988), Navy officer and politician
- Franklin Delano Roosevelt III (born 1938), economist

== G ==
- George Emlen Roosevelt (1887–1963), banker
- Grace Roosevelt (1867–1945), American tennis player

== H ==
- Hall Roosevelt (1891–1941), brother of Eleanor Roosevelt
- Henry L. Roosevelt (1879–1936), Assistant Secretary of the U.S. Navy
- Hilborne Roosevelt (1849–1886), organ builder

== I ==
- Isaac Roosevelt (businessman) (1790–1863), grandfather of Franklin Roosevelt
- Isaac Roosevelt (politician) (1726–1794), banker and New York Revolutionary-era legislator

== J ==
- James Roosevelt (disambiguation)
- Johannes Roosevelt (bap.1689–1750), New York City merchant
- John Aspinwall Roosevelt (1916–1981), businessman
- Joseph Willard Roosevelt (1918–2008), pianist and composer
- Julian Roosevelt (1924–1986), Olympic yachtsman

== K ==
- Kermit Roosevelt (1889–1943), son of Theodore Roosevelt
- Kermit Roosevelt Jr. (1916–2000), CIA officer
- Kermit Roosevelt III (born 1971), law professor and author, grandson of Kermit Roosevelt Jr.

== M ==
- Mark Roosevelt (born 1955), Democratic politician and president of St. John's College in Santa Fe, New Mexico
- Martha Bulloch Roosevelt (1835–1884), mother of Theodore Roosevelt

== N ==
- Naaman Roosevelt (born 1987), American football wide receiver
- Nicholas Roosevelt (1658–1742), New York City alderman
- Nicholas Roosevelt (inventor) (1767–1854), played a role in the development of the steamboat
- Nicholas Roosevelt (diplomat) (1893–1982), diplomat, journalist and author

== P ==
- Philip Roosevelt (1892–1941), banker and World War I Army captain

== Q ==
- Quentin Roosevelt (1897–1918), son of Theodore Roosevelt
- Quentin Roosevelt II (1919–1948), son of Theodore Roosevelt Jr.

== R ==
- Robert Roosevelt (1829–1906), U.S. Congressman

== S ==
- Samuel M. Roosevelt (1858–1920), portrait painter
- Sara Roosevelt (1854–1941), mother of Franklin Roosevelt
- Sara Wilford (1932–2021), psychology professor
- Selwa Roosevelt (born 1929), American journalist and wife of Archibald Bulloch Roosevelt Jr.
- Susan Roosevelt Weld (born c.1945), First Lady of Massachusetts

== T ==
- Tadd Roosevelt (1879–1958), nephew of Franklin Delano Roosevelt
- Theodore Roosevelt (disambiguation)
  - Theodore Roosevelt (1858–1919), U.S. president
- Tweed Roosevelt (born 1942), businessman

== W ==
- William Donner Roosevelt (1932–2003), banker

== See also ==
- Roosevelt family, U.S. merchant and political family
