= TRHS =

TRHS may refer to:

- Theodore Roosevelt High School (Gary), a high school in Gary, Indiana
- Theodore Roosevelt High School (Des Moines), a high school in Des Moines, Iowa
- Theodore Roosevelt High School (New York City), a former high school in the Bronx, New York
- Theodore Roosevelt High School (Kent, Ohio)
- ThunderRidge High School, a high school in Highlands Ranch, Colorado
- Timberlane Regional High School, a high school in Plaistow, New Hampshire
- Transactions of the Royal Historical Society, a United Kingdom scholarly journal
- Two Rivers High School (Arkansas), a high school in Ola, Arkansas
- Two Rivers High School (Wisconsin) - Two Rivers, Wisconsin, USA

== See also ==
- Roosevelt High School (disambiguation)
