= Fort Humphreys =

Fort Humphreys may refer to:

- Fort Belvoir in Virginia, known as Camp A. A. Humphreys from 1917 to 1922 and as Fort Humphreys from 1922 to 1935
- Fort Lesley J. McNair in Washington, D.C., known as Fort Humphreys from 1935 to 1948
