= Feel Alright (disambiguation) =

"Feel Alright" is a song by Kardinal Offishall.

Feel Alright may also refer to:

- "Feel Alright", a song by Komiko
- "Feel Alright", a song by Garageland
- "Feel Alright", a song by Sean Paul

== See also ==
- I Feel Alright, an album by Steve Earle
- "1970", alternate title "I Feel Alright", a song by the Stooges from Fun House
- Feel Right (disambiguation)
