= President Roosevelt =

President Roosevelt may refer to:

- Theodore Roosevelt (1858–1919), 26th president of the United States
  - Presidency of Theodore Roosevelt, his presidency
- Franklin D. Roosevelt (1882–1945), 32nd president of the United States and fifth cousin of the 26th president
  - Presidency of Franklin D. Roosevelt, his presidency

== Other uses ==
- SS President Roosevelt, several ships by the name
  - SS President Roosevelt (1921), an oceanliner that was requisitioned for service as a troopship with the U.S. Navy
  - SS President Roosevelt (1944), a U.S. Navy troopship
- President Theodore Roosevelt High School

== See also ==
- Roosevelt (disambiguation)
- Roosevelt family
