= SS Roosevelt =

SS Roosevelt may refer to:

- SS Roosevelt (1905), an American steamship that supported Robert Peary's polar expeditions
- SS President Roosevelt, the name of more than one ship

== See also ==
- USS Roosevelt, which may refer to various United States Navy ships
