= Greek Theatre (Los Angeles) =

Performance venue in California, US

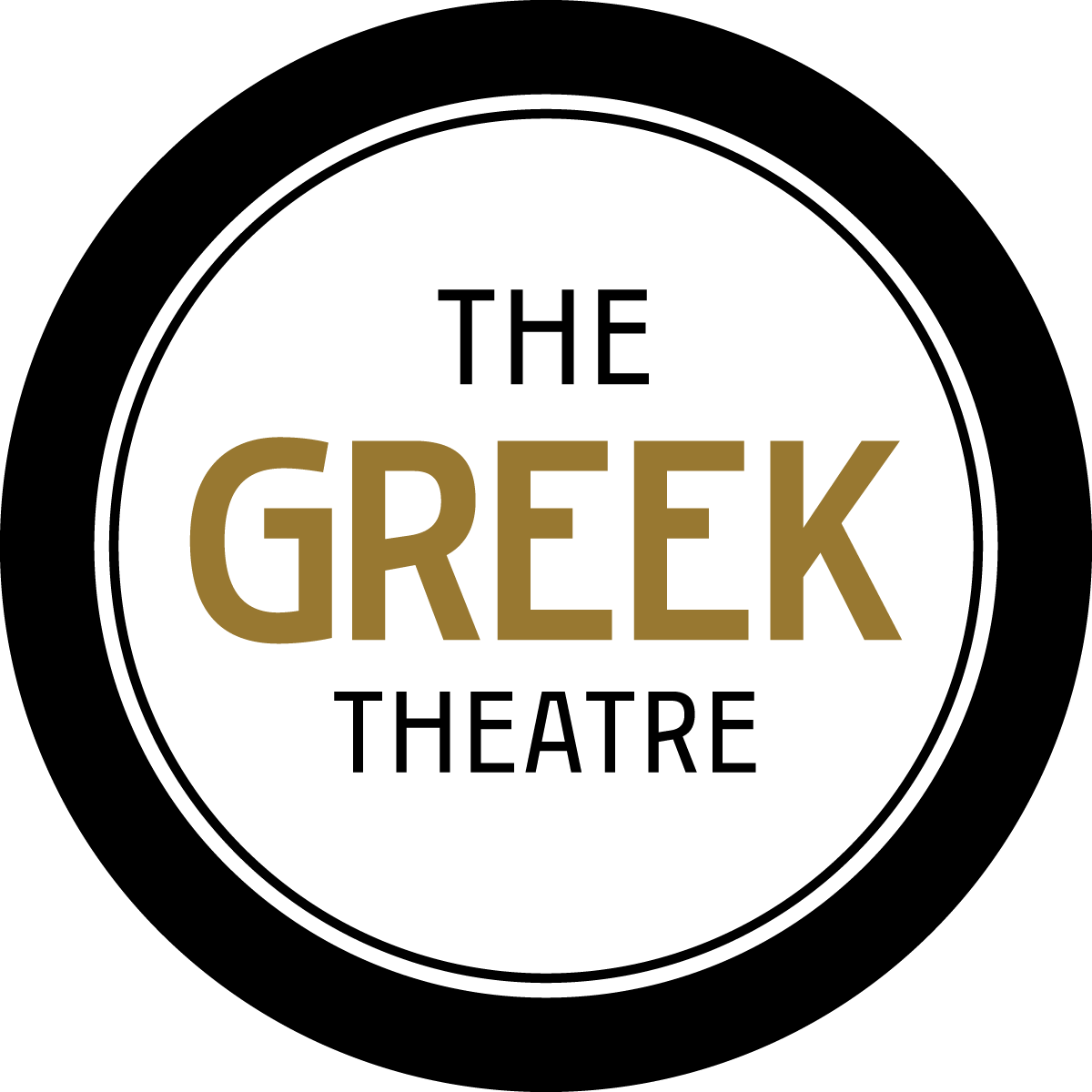

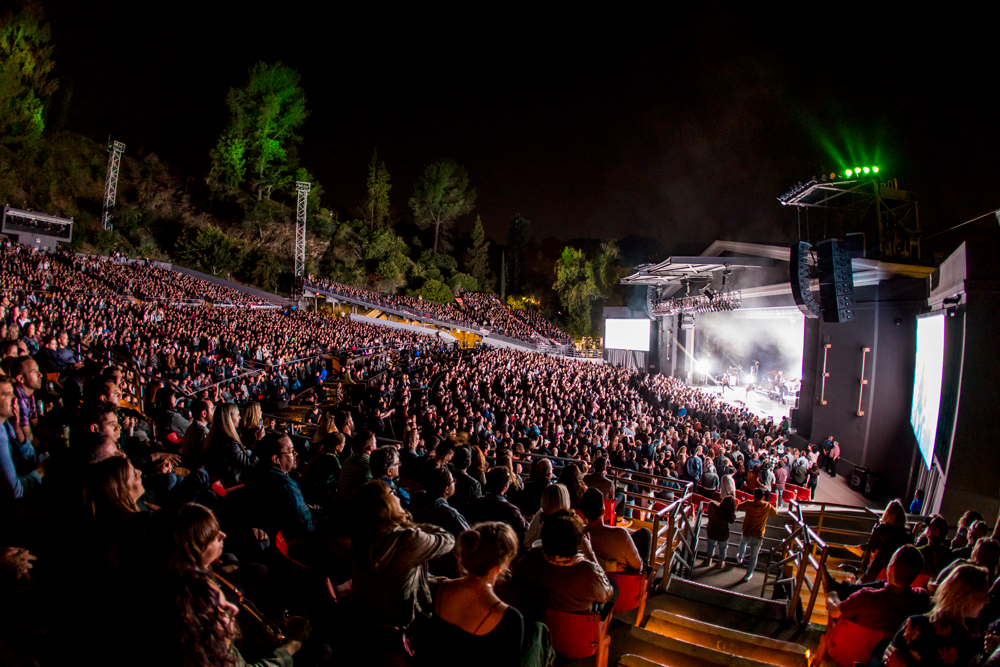
- Amphitheatre during a concert (c. 2019)
- Address: 2700 N. Vermont Avenue; Los Angeles, California 90027-1247
- Location: Griffith Park
- Coordinates: 34.1197°N 118.2961°W
- Owner: City of Los Angeles
- Operator: ASM Global
- Seating type: reserved seating
- Capacity: 5,900
- Type: amphitheatre
- Event: music concerts
- Current use: concerts, stage shows, graduation ceremonies

Construction
- Groundbreaking: 1928; 98 years ago
- Opened: September 25, 1930; 96 years ago

Website
- Official website

Greek Theatre is an amphitheatre and performance venue located in Griffith Park, Los Angeles, California, which has been hosting various live performances and music concerts since its opening in the early 1930s. Today, the theatre is owned by the City of Los Angeles and operated by ASM Global (AEG Ogden). Designed by architects Samuel Tilden Norton, Frederick Hastings Wallis, and Tacoma firm Heath, Gove, & Bell, the main stage and seating layout were inspired by Ancient Greek-style amphitheaters.

== History ==
The idea for the Greek Theatre originated with wealthy landowner Griffith J. Griffith, who donated 3,000 acres (1,200 ha) of land to the city of Los Angeles in 1896 to create Griffith Park. In his will he left money for the construction of a Greek theatre. A canyon site was chosen because of its good acoustics. The cornerstone was laid in 1928 and the building was dedicated on September 25, 1930. The first performance took place on June 26, 1931, attended by a capacity crowd of 4,000.

During its first decades the theatre was rarely used, although it was utilized as a barracks for troops during World War II. In the late 1940s a San Francisco producer brought touring shows to the venue. In 1952 (and for the next 23 years) James A. Doolittle, a Los Angeles dance impresario, leased the theatre and upgraded it with better seating and backstage equipment. Over time, Doolittle brought classical productions, entertainers and popular music concerts to the venue in a mixed summer season. Under his management the Greek Theatre introduced Los Angeles to many of the celebrated dance, opera and foreign theatre companies of the world and was credited at the time with enhancing Los Angeles's cultural image. Some of these foreign visitors came to America for the first time at the instigation of Doolittle and the Greek Theatre Association, and continued their successful tours in New York City – a reversal of the traditional route of importation at the time.

Between 1975 and 2015, the theatre was managed by the Nederlander Organization, which further improved it and continued a regular rotation of contemporary and classical productions and concerts. The theatre underwent an earthquake retrofit in 1995. In 2006 the facade was renovated in celebration of the venue's 75th anniversary. In 2015, Live Nation attempted to replace Nederlander in operating the theatre, leading to a joint venture with Live Nation and Nederlander, along with Goldenvoice, programming shows while SMG managed the venue.

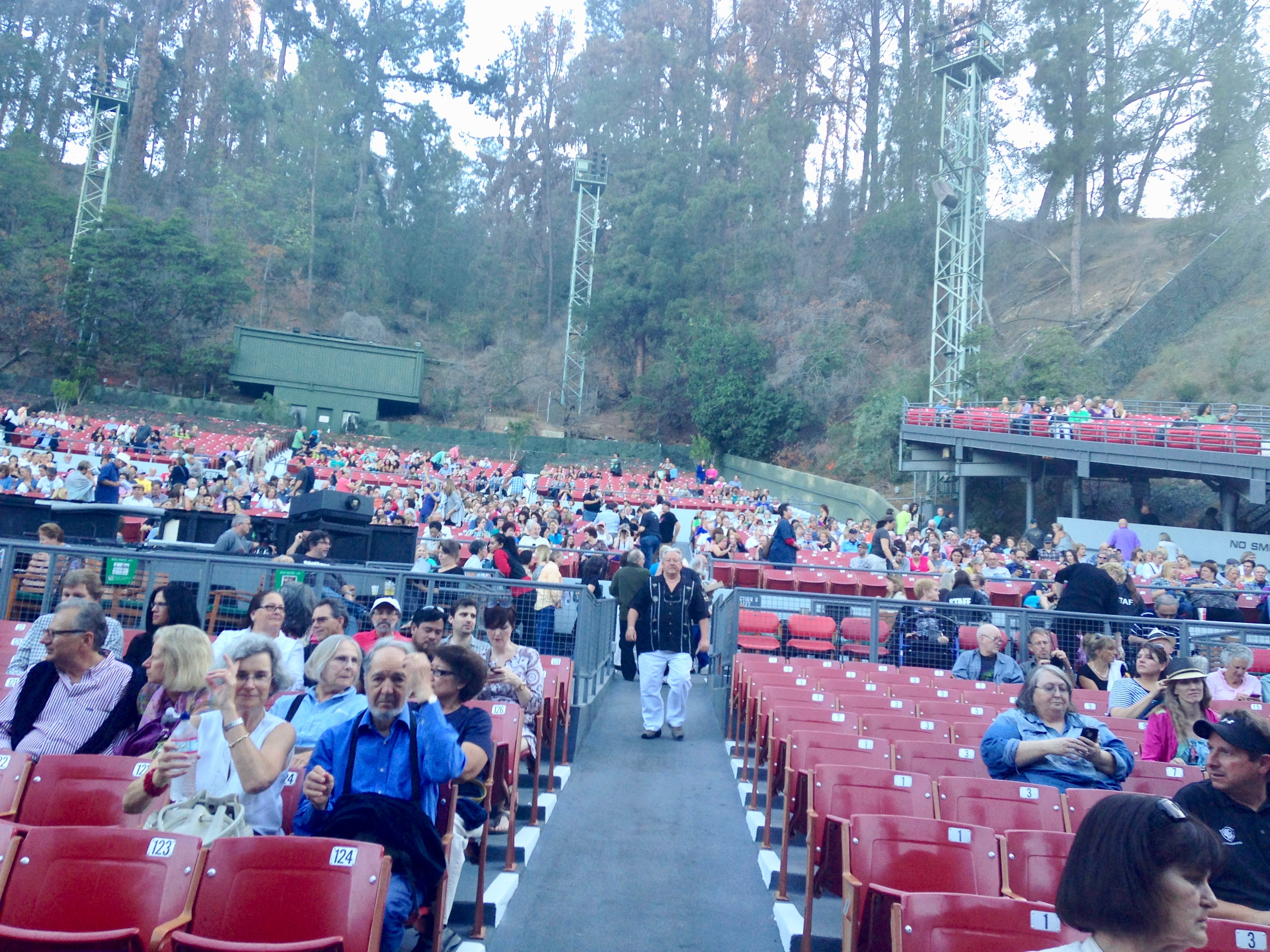
Greek Theatre filling up for the Joan Baez/Indigo Girls concert in 2014.

The venue cancelled its season in 2020 due to the COVID-19 pandemic which would have been its 90th anniversary and also put up for sale their red chairs that were replaced for renovation in the terrace sections.

=== Capacity ===
In 1983, the Greek Theatre's seating capacity was expanded to 6,187, but renovations brought the Greek Theatre's capacity down to 6,162 in 1995 and to 5,700 in 2004. In 2009 the Los Angeles Fire Marshal permitted the addition of two more rows in the pit, bringing full capacity at the Greek to 5,870 seated and 5,900 general admission.

== Current usage ==
The Greek Theatre is used for concerts, stage shows, and graduation ceremonies for Thomas Starr King Middle School and John Marshall High School, among others.

The annual Bell-Jeff Invitational cross country running event starts adjacent to the theater.

== Filming and recording ==
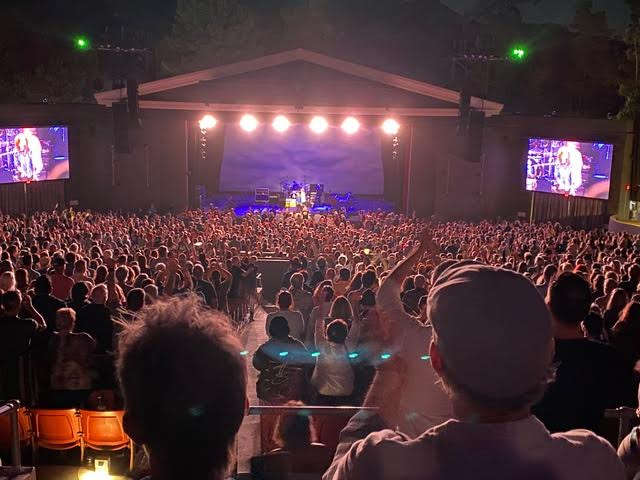
Bonnie Raitt concert at the Greek in September 2022.

Several live recordings and televised concert specials have been recorded and filmed at the Greek, including shows by The Go-Go's, Ringo Starr, Joe Bonamassa and Chicago. Neil Diamond recorded his live album, Hot August Night (1972), at the Greek Theatre, and four years later, returned to record Love at the Greek (1976), from which footage was used for a televised concert special. The British-American rock band America recorded their America Live (1977) album at the Greek. Jimmy Page and the Black Crowes also recorded their Live at the Greek (2000) album at the Greek.

In 2022, as part of Netflix Is a Joke Festival, Stand Out: An LGBTQ+ Celebration was recorded and later aired on Netflix, headlined by Eddie Izzard, Margaret Cho, and Rosie O'Donnell and included many other LGBTQ+ stand up comedians.

Movies that have been filmed at the theatre include Bye Bye Birdie (1963) and Get Him to the Greek (2010). Also, the live concert scene of the song "Shallow", as performed by Lady Gaga and Bradley Cooper in the 2018 adaptation of the film A Star Is Born, was filmed at the Greek Theatre.

== See also ==
- List of contemporary amphitheaters
