= Roosevelt School =

Roosevelt School may refer to:

- Roosevelt School (Yuma, Arizona), listed on the National Register of Historic Places (NRHP) in Yuma County, Arizona
- Roosevelt School (Lake Wales, Florida), NRHP-listed
- Roosevelt School (Boise, Idaho), NRHP-listed
- Roosevelt School (Coeur d'Alene, Idaho), listed on the NRHP in Kootenai County, Idaho
- Roosevelt School (Ames, Iowa), NRHP-listed
- Roosevelt School (Hamlin, Maine), NRHP-listed
- Roosevelt School (St. John, Maine), built in 1920, NRHP-listed
- Roosevelt School (Bernalillo, New Mexico), listed on the NRHP in Sandoval County, New Mexico
- Roosevelt School (Casper, Wyoming), built in 1922, NRHP-listed

== See also ==
- Roosevelt (disambiguation)
- Roosevelt Elementary School (disambiguation)
- Roosevelt Junior High School (disambiguation)
- Roosevelt Middle School (disambiguation)
- Roosevelt High School (disambiguation)
- Roosevelt School District (disambiguation)
- Roosevelt Intermediate School
