= Roosevelt Elementary School =

Roosevelt Elementary School may refer to:

- Roosevelt Elementary School (Santa Ana, California)
- Roosevelt Elementary School (Tampa, Florida)
- Roosevelt Elementary School (Waterloo, Iowa)
- Roosevelt Elementary School (Philadelphia, Pennsylvania)
- Roosevelt Elementary School (Laredo, Texas)
- Roosevelt Elementary School (Bellingham, Washington)

== See also ==
- Roosevelt High School (disambiguation)
- Roosevelt Intermediate School
- Roosevelt Junior High School (disambiguation)
- Roosevelt Middle School (disambiguation)
- Roosevelt School (disambiguation)
