= Roosevelt Junior High School =

Roosevelt Junior High School may refer to:

- Roosevelt Junior High School (Decatur, Illinois)
- Roosevelt Elementary School (Philadelphia, Pennsylvania), formerly Theodore Roosevelt Junior High School
- Roosevelt Junior High School, in the Roosevelt Independent School District near Roosevelt, Texas

== See also ==
- Roosevelt Elementary School (disambiguation)
- Roosevelt High School (disambiguation)
- Roosevelt Intermediate School
- Roosevelt Middle School (disambiguation)
- Roosevelt School (disambiguation)
