= Young Romance (album) =

Studio album by Roosevelt
- Released: 28 September 2018
- Genre: Synth-pop; dance rock
- Length: 50:49
- Label: City Slang; Greco-Roman
- Producer: Roosevelt

Roosevelt chronology
Roosevelt (2016)	Young Romance (2018)	Polydans (2021)

Young Romance is the second studio album by German musician and producer Roosevelt, released on 28 September 2018 through City Slang. It includes a guest appearance from American chillwave producer Washed Out on the track "Forgive". It received mixed to positive reviews from critics.

== Critical reception ==
Professional ratings
Aggregate scores
Source	Rating
Metacritic	65/100
Review scores
Source	Rating
The 405	6/10
AllMusic	3.5/5 stars
Clash	5/10
Exclaim!	7/10
The Observer	3/5 stars
PopMatters	6/10

Young Romance received a score of 65 out of 100 on review aggregator Metacritic based on six critics' reviews, indicating "generally favorable" reception. Neil Z. Yeung of AllMusic described it as a "synth-driven exercise in retro-flavored indie dance rock. However, while its predecessor was a neon-washed, digital throbber, Young Romance expands Roosevelt's palette with bright, uplifting anthems similar to Miike Snow, Capital Cities, and Currents-era Tame Impala". Exclaim!'s Luke Pearson wrote that Roosevelt "rais[es] the bar throughout in terms of production and overall tightness, while adding some funk-lite guitar work for good measure as well".

Chase McMullen of The 405 summed it up as "a record that wears its influences plainly on its pulsating sleeves" and "more than pleasant enough to be worth it". Tara Joshi of The Observer opined that the album contains "an airbrushed, off-kilter kind of pop, and while he still isn't pushing the envelope, Young Romance is a pleasant enough listen". Reviewing the album for PopMatters, Pryor Stroud found that "Roosevelt's '80s-indebted yet EDM-inflected confections aren't as anthemic as he wants them to be, but they're almost uniformly infectious". Jess Atkinson of Clash felt that Roosevelt "struggles to innovate" on the album "despite a truly lush display of synth-work and production".

== Track listing ==
Young Romance track listing
No.	Title	Length
1.	"Take Me Back"	2:52
2.	"Under the Sun"	3:46
3.	"Yr Love"	4:32
4.	"Illusions"	4:45
5.	"Losing Touch"	3:58
6.	"Pangea"	3:19
7.	"Lucia"	4:09
8.	"Better Days"	5:49
9.	"Shadows"	4:26
10.	"Last to Know"	3:57
11.	"Forgive" (featuring Washed Out)	4:38
12.	"Getaway"	4:37
Total length:		50:49

Deluxe edition bonus tracks
No.	Title	Length
13.	"Falling Back"	4:39
14.	"Everywhere"	3:20
15.	"Yr Love" (midnight version)	7:15
16.	"Take Me Back" (midnight version)	7:08
17.	"Shadows" (midnight version)	7:25
Total length:		80:22

== Charts ==
Chart performance for Young Romance
Chart (2018)	Peak position
German Albums (Offizielle Top 100)	58
Swiss Albums (Schweizer Hitparade)	80
