= Roosevelt School District =

Roosevelt School District is the name of several school districts in the United States:

- Roosevelt Elementary School District, Phoenix, Arizona
- Roosevelt Public School District, Roosevelt, New Jersey
- Roosevelt School District, Roosevelt, New York
- Roosevelt School District, Roosevelt, Washington
- Roosevelt Independent School District, in Lubbock County, Texas

== See also ==
- Roosevelt School (disambiguation)
- Roosevelt (disambiguation)
