= Roosevelt (given name) =

Roosevelt is a masculine given name borne by:

== People ==
- Roosevelt Adams (born 1994), Filipino-American basketball player
- Booba Barnes (1936–1996), American Delta blues guitar player and singer
- Roosevelt Barnes (American football) (born 1958), American sports agent and former National Football League player
- Roosevelt Blackmon (born 1974), American football player
- Roosevelt Bouie (born 1958), American retired basketball player
- Roosevelt Brown (baseball) (born 1975), American retired Major League Baseball player
- Rosey Brown (1932–2004), American National Football League player, member of the Pro Football Hall of Fame
- Theodore Roosevelt Cox (born 1914), American retired Negro league baseball player
- Rosie Douglas (1941–2000), Dominican politician
- Sandy Gilliam (1932–2014), American football and baseball coach and pro football scout
- Rosey Grier (born 1932), American former National Football League player, actor and singer
- Roosevelt Mercer Jr., United States Air Force retired major general and Federal Aviation Administration executive
- Roosevelt Nix (defensive end) (born 1967), American former National Football League player
- Roosevelt Nix (fullback) (born 1992), American former National Football League player, son of the above
- Roosevelt Oyola (born 1991), Ecuadorian footballer
- Roosevelt Polite (1912–1981), American politician
- Roosevelt Roberts (born 1994), American mixed martial artist
- Roosevelt Skerrit (born 1972), Dominican politician
- Roosevelt Sykes (1906–1983), American blues singer, songwriter and musician
- Baby Face Willette (1933–1971), American hard bop and soul jazz musician
- Roosevelt Zanders (1912–1995), owner of the New York City limousine service Zanders Auto Rental Service

== Fictional characters ==
- Roosevelt Franklin, a Muppet featured on the children's television series Sesame Street during the early 1970s
