= Polydans =

Studio album by Roosevelt
- Released: 26 February 2021
- Genre: Techno; R&B
- Length: 41:52
- Label: City Slang; Greco-Roman
- Producer: Roosevelt

Roosevelt chronology
Young Romance (2018)	Polydans (2021)	Embrace (2023)

Polydans is the third studio album by German musician and producer Roosevelt, released on 26 February 2021 through City Slang.

== Background ==
Roosevelt called Polydans his "most personal album yet" as there were no "creative limitations" and he "just did what made [him] happy".

== Critical reception ==
Professional ratings
Review scores
Source	Rating
MusicOMH	3.5/5 stars
Pitchfork	6.4/10

Bailey Constas of Pitchfork wrote that the album "floats between glorifying the past and dreaming of a future that might not come" and found it "almost hard to believe an album this syrupy came from within the same four walls of isolation as the rest of us. The mysterious depth that shadowed Roosevelt's earlier work feels sugarcoated". MusicOMH's Ben Devlin compared the album to Daft Punk's Random Access Memories (2013) as it finds "euphoric abandon amongst the funky basslines, infectious hooks and unapologetically decadent arrangements", concluding that it is "a breezy trip through those sounds and styles we just can't get enough of, and its groovy production and smooth songwriting go down well".

== Track listing ==
Polydans track listing
No.	Title	Length
1.	"Easy Way Out"	4:34
2.	"Strangers"	3:40
3.	"Feels Right"	4:34
4.	"Closer to My Heart"	4:43
5.	"Montjuic"	1:34
6.	"Forget"	5:08
7.	"See You Again"	4:22
8.	"Lovers"	3:23
9.	"Echoes"	5:36
10.	"Sign"	4:18
Total length:		41:52

Deluxe edition bonus tracks
No.	Title	Length
11.	"(Feels Like) Heaven"	3:30
12.	"On My Mind" (short version)	3:57
13.	"About U"	5:12
14.	"Sign" (piano version)	3:49
15.	"Echoes" (guitar version)	5:29
16.	"Feels Right" (Spin session)	4:14
17.	"Strangers" (Spin session)	3:40
18.	"Sign" (Spin session)	4:20
Total length:		76:03

== Charts ==
Chart performance for Polydans
Chart (2021)	Peak position
German Albums (Offizielle Top 100)	23
Swiss Albums (Schweizer Hitparade)	35
