= Roosevelt, Texas =

Roosevelt, Texas may refer to:

- Roosevelt, Kimble County, Texas, a ghost town
- Roosevelt, Lubbock County, Texas, an unincorporated community
