= Roosevelt Expressway =

The following roads are called the Roosevelt Expressway:

- Roosevelt Expressway (Jacksonville), Florida
- Roosevelt Expressway, part of the Roosevelt Boulevard in Philadelphia, Pennsylvania
- Theodore Roosevelt Expressway in North Dakota, South Dakota, and Montana
- FDR Drive in New York City, an expressway named after Franklin D. Roosevelt
