= Roosevelt Hotel =

The Roosevelt Hotel may refer to:

- Roosevelt Hotel (Manhattan)
- The Hollywood Roosevelt Hotel
- Hotel Roosevelt (Cedar Rapids, Iowa)
- The Roosevelt Hotel New Orleans
- Roosevelt Hotel (Portland, Oregon)

== See also ==
- Hotel Roosevelt, now The Carling, in Jacksonville, Florida
  - Hotel Roosevelt fire, Jacksonville
