= Eleanor Roosevelt (Hato Rey) =

- Subbarrio
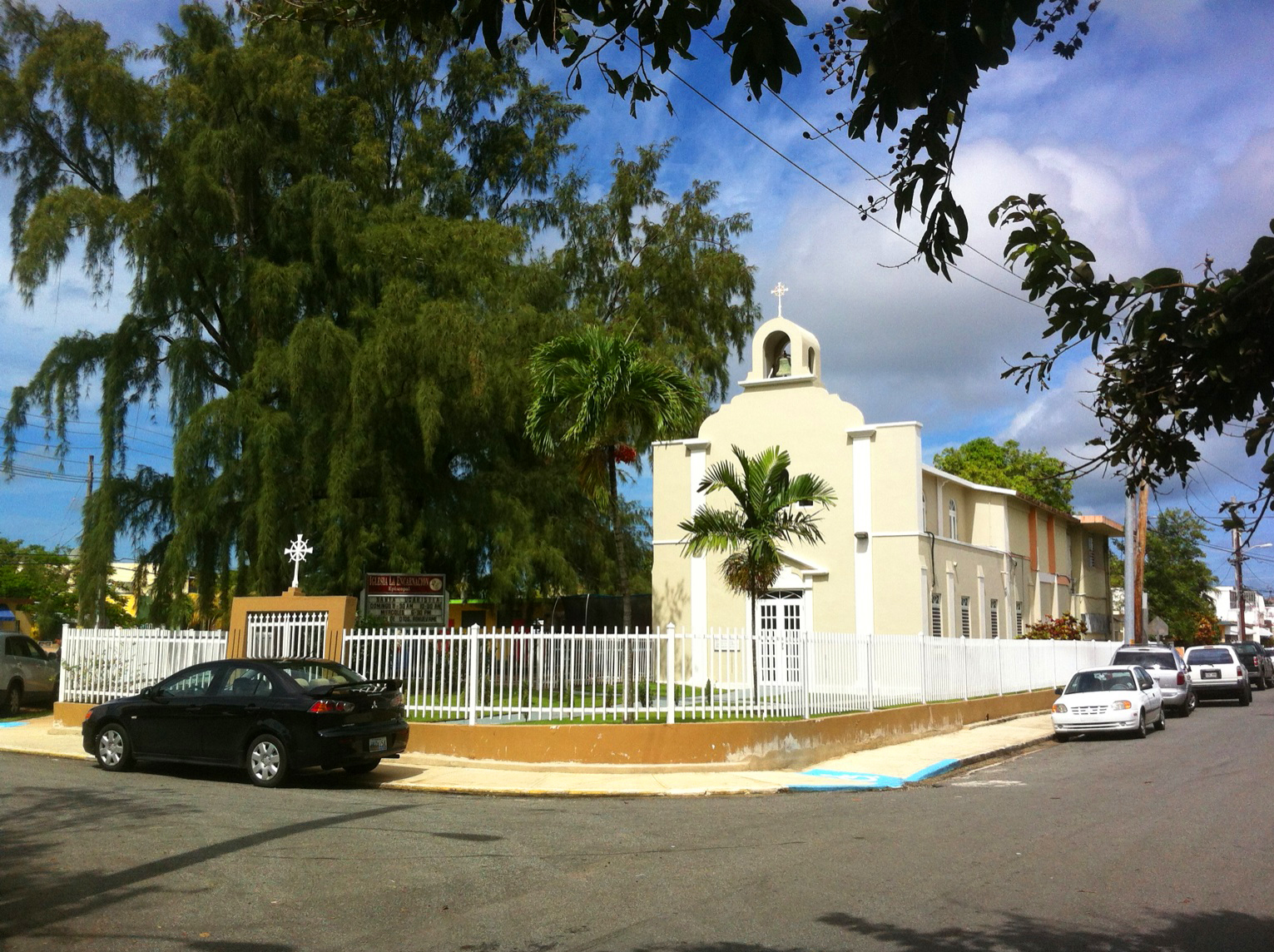
- Church in Eleanor Roosevelt
- Interactive map of Eleanor Roosevelt
- Coordinates: 18.4160027°N 66.0688030°W
- Commonwealth: Puerto Rico
- Municipality: San Juan

Government
  - Type: Borough of San Juan
  - Borough President: Jorge Santini
  - Secretary of Education: Jesús Rivera Sánchez

Area
  - Total: 1.6 km^{2} (0.63 sq mi)
- Elevation: 7 m (23 ft)

Population
  - Total: 5,075
- Source: 2000 United States census

Eleanor Roosevelt is one of the 12 sectors of Hato Rey.
