= Roosevelt Lake =

Lake Roosevelt or Roosevelt Lake is the name of multiple places:

in the United States:

- Theodore Roosevelt Lake ("Roosevelt Lake" or "Lake Roosevelt") on the Salt River in Arizona
- Franklin D. Roosevelt Lake ("Lake Roosevelt") on the Columbia River in Washington
  - Lake Roosevelt National Recreation Area, Washington
- Roosevelt Lake (Arkansas) in Conway County, Arkansas
- Roosevelt Lake (Minnesota)
- Roosevelt Lake (Missoula County, Montana) in Missoula County, Montana
- Roosevelt Lake (Stillwater County, Montana) in Stillwater County, Montana
- Roosevelt Lake (Ohio) near Portsmouth
- Roosevelt Lake (Rhode Island)

in Chile:

- Roosevelt Lake a lake in southern Chile.
