= Roosevelt Hall (National War College) =

United States historic place

Coordinates: 38.8631°N 77.0170°W

- National War College; Roosevelt Hall
- U.S. National Register of Historic Places
- U.S. National Historic Landmark
- D.C. Inventory of Historic Sites
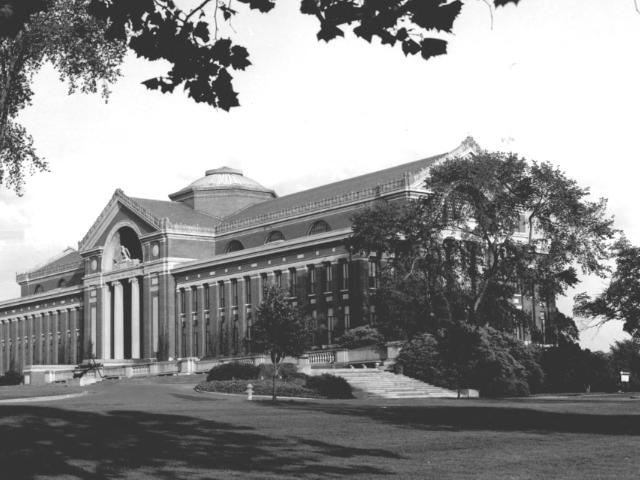
- Roosevelt Hall at Fort Lesley J. McNair, which houses the National War College

- Location within Washington, D.C. Location within the District of Columbia Location within the United States
- Location: Washington, D.C.
- Built: 1903–07
- Architect: McKim, Mead, and White
- Architectural style: Neo-Classical; Beaux Arts
- NRHP reference No.: 72001535

Significant dates
- Added to NRHP: November 28, 1972
- Designated DCIHS: November 8, 1964

Roosevelt Hall is an immense Beaux Arts-style building housing the National War College on Fort Lesley J. McNair, Washington, D.C., United States. The original home of the Army War College (1907–1946), it was built between 1903 and 1907 to designs by McKim, Mead & White, and has been listed on the National Register of Historic Places as a National Historic Landmark since 1972.

== History ==
Roosevelt Hall was originally built as the central focus of enormous complex envisioned by President Theodore Roosevelt and Secretary of War Elihu Root to house a General Staff School for senior U.S. Army officers. The historic Washington Arsenal (which became Fort McNair in 1948) was selected as the site. Between 1901 and 1903, the early 19th-century arsenal buildings were razed to make way for the projected complex. As many as fifty additional buildings were envisioned, including barracks, mess halls, and faculty quarters, but only Roosevelt Hall was completed and the ambitious plan was never realized in its entirety. The cornerstone for Roosevelt Hall was laid on February 21, 1903, and on June 30, 1907, the building was occupied for the first time.

Roosevelt Hall housed the Army War College (AWC) from 1907 to 1946 when that institution moved to Fort Leavenworth, Kansas (and a year later to Carlisle Barracks, Pennsylvania). Since 1946, it has housed the National War College (NWC), a training and doctrine institution embracing all branches of the armed forces, as well as the Department of State and the Central Intelligence Agency. The role of the NWC closely parallels that of the AWC, but on a broader, multi-service basis.

=== Expansions and renovations ===
Additional subterranean office space was excavated in the 1960s beneath the front (north) terrace of Roosevelt Hall so as not to affect the structure's exterior. The two main interior spaces have for the most part remained undisturbed over a century.

== Description ==
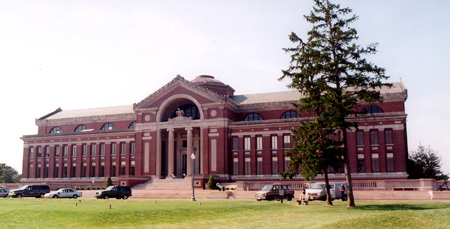
Roosevelt Hall.

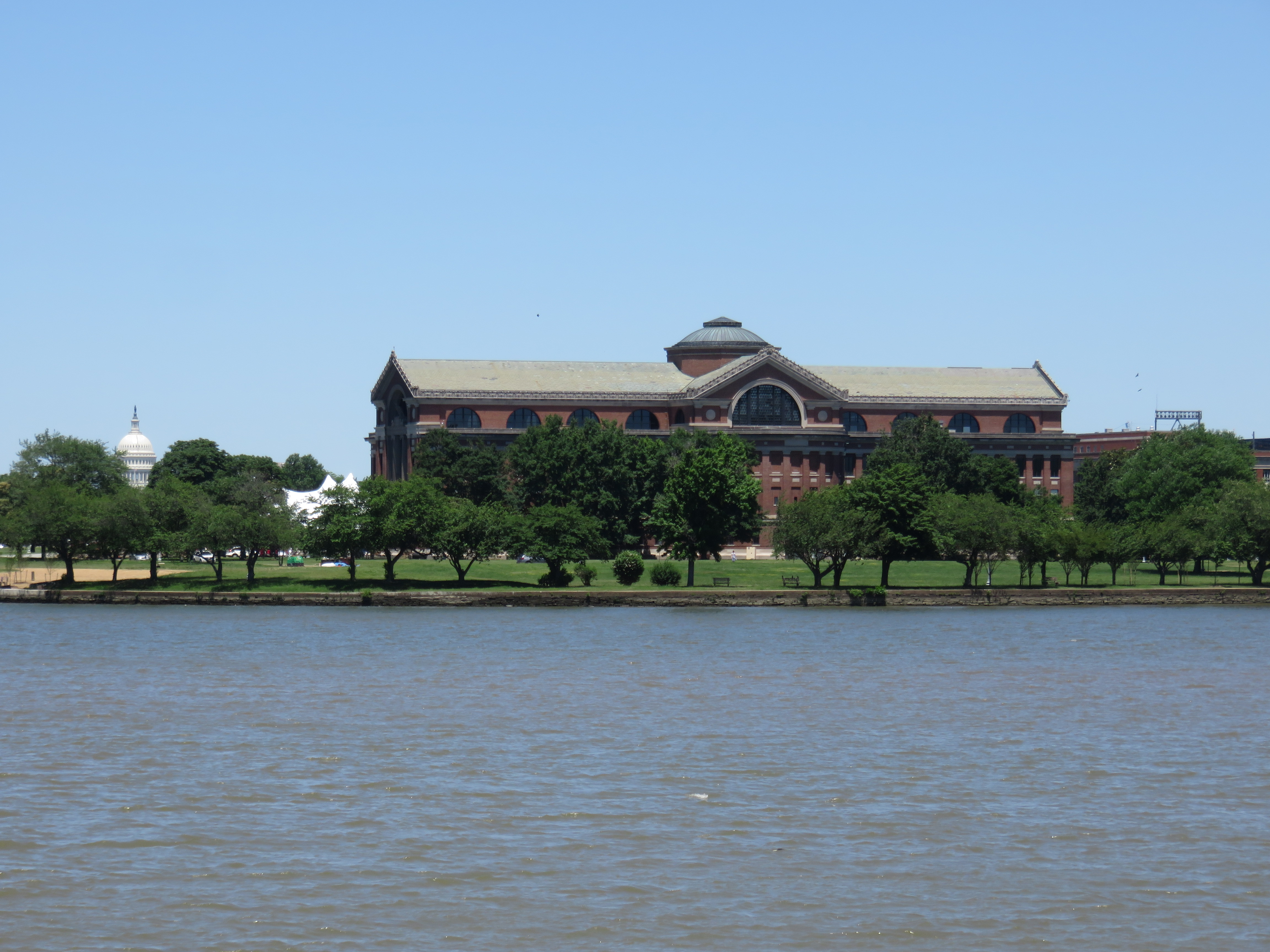
Rear of the building in 2019

Roosevelt Hall was designed by the noted New York architectural firm McKim, Mead and White in the Neoclassical or Beaux Arts style.

=== Exterior ===
The Neo-Classical style building is constructed of red brick with granite trim. It faces north onto a quarter-mile long greensward while the building's rear elevation overlooks the Potomac. The ground plan of Roosevelt Hall is oriented on a cross-axis formed by the intersection of a domed central pavilion and wings extending laterally to the east and west, each consisting of 12 bays. The main pavilion is pedimented and, on the north (main) facade, is distinguished by a tall arched loggia featuring a distyle in antis Ionic screen. (This is a motif also employed in the east and west gable ends of the building.) Surmounting the entablature of this columnar screen, in each instance, is a symbolic sculpted eagle.

Acroteria adorn the long, slate-covered ridge roof. The third floor is a clerestory, with four great arched clerestory openings in the form of thermal windows rising above the entablature of the pilastered, two-story wing elevations on both front and back. At the central pavilion, a two-story windowless, pilastered, vaultless apse projects from the south (back) elevation.

It was originally intended that the stepped terraces on the north side of Roosevelt Hall would include impressive statuary of great warriors. Podia for statues were constructed, but they were never installed, except for one of Frederick the Great, a gift of the German government soon after the completion of the edifice. Anti-German sentiment at the time of World War I forced its removal.

=== Interior ===
The central feature of the interior is a three-story, marble-floored rotunda, encircled on the upper levels by balustraded galleries. An inner saucer dome of vaulted brick covers the rotunda and terminates in an oculus through which a large metal chandelier is suspended from the outer dome. Contrasting with the severe white walls of the space are exposed brick structural members: pilasters and segmentally-arched brick vaulting supporting the galleries. Between two of the brick pilasters is a large marble plaque commemorating the efforts of Secretary of War Root in the establishment of the AWC. Flanking the plaque are portraits of Roosevelt and Secretary of War Henry Stimson. Additional portraits and busts of prominent American military figures also adorn the rotunda.

The east wing was extensively modernized in the mid-20th century and contains classrooms ranged along a central corridor at all three main levels. The west wing of the structure formerly was devoted to the extensive library of the NWC. Stack space consisted of five metal balconies, connected by bridges at the upper levels and bisected by a central corridor. At the far end of this long, vaulted room was a reading area. The former NWC library is now the location of the General Colin Powell Wing, featuring items donated by General Powell and his family. Powell was a graduate for NWC. The ground story houses more office and classroom space. The south side of the rotunda, in the central apse (bowed extension), is a lecture chamber.

== See also ==
- List of National Historic Landmarks in the District of Columbia
- National Register of Historic Places listings in the District of Columbia
