= Roosevelt Island (disambiguation) =

Roosevelt Island may refer to:

- Roosevelt Island, New York City, New York, United States
  - Roosevelt Island (IND 63rd Street Line), subway station on the island
- Theodore Roosevelt Island, Washington, D.C., United States
- Roosevelt Island, Antarctica
