= Feel Right =

Feel Right may refer to:

- "Feel Right" (Mark Ronson song), 2015
- "Feel Right" (Tanya Tucker song), 1982

== See also ==
- Feels Right (disambiguation)
