= Roosevelt (album) =

Studio album by Roosevelt
- Released: 19 August 2016
- Length: 46:43
- Label: City Slang; Greco-Roman
- Producer: Roosevelt

Roosevelt chronology
Elliot (2013)	Roosevelt (2016)	Young Romance (2018)

Roosevelt is the debut album by German musician and producer Roosevelt, released on 19 August 2016 through City Slang and Greco-Roman. It received generally positive reviews from critics and reached the top 40 on the charts in German-speaking Europe.

== Critical reception ==
Professional ratings
Aggregate scores
Source	Rating
Metacritic	73/100
Review scores
Source	Rating
AllMusic	3/5 stars
Exclaim!	7/10
The Independent	4/5 stars
The Line of Best Fit	6/10
No Ripcord	6/10
Paste	8.2/10
Pitchfork	7.0/10

Roosevelt received a score of 73 out of 100 on review aggregator Metacritic based on nine critics' reviews, indicating "generally favorable" reception. Marcy Donelson of AllMusic felt that Roosevelt's "techno-infused indie pop manages to incorporate dance tropes (four on the floor, '80s Casio tones, occasional tropical instruments, etc.) without turning out mere style exercises. Beats, grooves, and melodic hooks get swept up in a breeze that lingers over pop forms -- for the most part". Exclaim!'s Ryan McNutt described it as "Epcot Centre pop music: nostalgia for another generation's vision of the future" but remarked that it is "worth the ride" as "Lauber's got an impressive knack for rhythm that greatly benefits his slow-burning compositions".

Ben Rosner of Paste called it "a winning debut record, filled with astute production, well-crafted lyrical content, enticing chords, beautiful melodies and sun-soaked choruses". Ellis Victoria of No Ripcord stated that "for a debut album, it's an incredibly assured piece of work. There are some genuinely fulfilling cuts here, and his perfectionism with the structure makes for smooth multiple visits. It is a solid and adept demonstration of his strengths as a dance producer and his ear for a hook".

Reviewing the album for Pitchfork, Cameron Cook opined that it "sounds like an almost scientific approach to a summer dance record; a cocktail of disco, French touch, Ibiza house, yacht rock, and electropop that evokes some crowded Tiki-torch dancefloor lost on the Mediterranean coast". Andy Gill of The Independent found that the album has "a slick sonic design and retro flavour akin to Random Access Memories but rather than the 70s, he's gazing fondly back at the early rave era". John Bell of The Line of Best Fit wrote that tracks like "Fever" and "Closer", while a "pop anthem" and "dreamy end to the record" respectively, "lack something that the first tastes promised, and so pieced together it feels like the debut is not worth more than the sum of its parts".

== Track listing ==
Roosevelt track listing
No.	Title	Length
1.	"Intro"	1:31
2.	"Wait Up"	4:22
3.	"Night Moves"	4:56
4.	"Belong"	3:57
5.	"Moving On"	4:43
6.	"Heart"	4:05
7.	"Colours"	4:19
8.	"Sea"	4:26
9.	"Daytona"	2:53
10.	"Fever"	4:24
11.	"Hold On"	3:27
12.	"Close"	3:40
Total length:		46:43

== Charts ==
Chart performance for Roosevelt
Chart (2016)	Peak position
Austrian Albums (Ö3 Austria)	36
Dutch Albums (Album Top 100)	155
German Albums (Offizielle Top 100)	27
Swiss Albums (Schweizer Hitparade)	33
UK Independent Albums (OCC)	49
US Top Dance/Electronic Albums (Billboard)	11
