= James Roosevelt (disambiguation) =

James Roosevelt II (1907–1991) was an American congressman and son of 32nd US president Franklin D. Roosevelt.

James Roosevelt may also refer to:

- James Roosevelt I (1828–1900), American businessman and father of Franklin D. Roosevelt
- James Roosevelt Roosevelt (1854–1927), American diplomat and the older half-brother of Franklin D. Roosevelt
- James Roosevelt (lawyer) (born 1945), attorney, Democratic Party official, son of James Roosevelt and grandson of Franklin D. Roosevelt
- James A. Roosevelt (1825–1898), American philanthropist and uncle of 26th US president Theodore Roosevelt
- James H. Roosevelt (1800–1863), American philanthropist
- James I. Roosevelt (1795–1875), United States Representative from New York
- James Roosevelt (1760–1847), American businessman and politician from New York City
- James Jacobus Roosevelt (1759–1840), American businessman from New York City
- Tadd Roosevelt (James Roosevelt Roosevelt Jr., 1879–1958), American heir and automobile worker, nephew of Franklin D. Roosevelt
