= Roosevelt, Wisconsin =

Roosevelt is the name of some places in the U.S. state of Wisconsin:

- Roosevelt, Burnett County, Wisconsin, a town
- Roosevelt, Taylor County, Wisconsin, a town
- Roosevelt, Oneida County, Wisconsin, an unincorporated community
