= Theodore Roosevelt Highway =

Theodore Roosevelt Highway or Roosevelt Highway may refer to:

- Theodore Roosevelt International Highway in the United States and Canada
- Roosevelt Highway (Georgia) in the United States
- Roosevelt Highway (Washington) in the United States
- Roosevelt Highway (Oregon) on the Pacific coast
- Roosevelt Highway, an old name for the Pacific Coast Highway within Los Angeles County, California
- Roosevelt Midland Trail in the United States
- Churchill–Roosevelt Highway in Trinidad and Tobago

== See also ==
- Theodore Roosevelt (disambiguation)
