= Roosevelt Station =

Roosevelt Station can refer to:

- Roosevelt station (CTA), an "L" station in Chicago, Illinois, United States
- Museum Campus/11th Street station, a Metra/South Shore Line commuter rail station in Chicago, Illinois, United States, originally named Roosevelt Road
- Roosevelt station (Puerto Rico), a Tren Urbano station in San Juan, Puerto Rico, United States
- Roosevelt station (Sound Transit), a Link light rail station in Seattle, Washington, United States
- Roosevelt/Central Avenue station, a METRO Light Rail station in Phoenix, Arizona, United States
- Franklin D. Roosevelt station, a Paris Metro station in Paris, France
- Fernando Poe Jr. station, a Manila Light Rail Transit System station in Quezon City, Metro Manila, Philippines, originally named Roosevelt
