= Anna Roosevelt =

Anna Roosevelt may refer to:

- Anna Bamie Roosevelt (1855–1931), sister of Theodore Roosevelt, aunt of Eleanor Roosevelt
- Anna Hall Roosevelt (1863–1892), mother of US First Lady Eleanor Roosevelt
- Anna Eleanor Roosevelt (1884-1962), First Lady of the United States
- Anna Roosevelt Halsted (1906–1975), first child of Eleanor Roosevelt and Franklin D. Roosevelt
- Anna Curtenius Roosevelt (born 1946), American archaeologist, great-granddaughter of Theodore Roosevelt
