= Roosevelt Bridge =

Roosevelt Bridge may refer to:

- Roosevelt Bridge (Florida), a major highway bridge in Martin County, Florida, United States
- Franklin Delano Roosevelt Bridge between Maine and Campobello Island in New Brunswick, Canada
- Theodore Roosevelt Bridge, a bridge located in Washington, D.C.
- Theodore Roosevelt Lake Bridge, a vehicular bridge traversing Theodore Roosevelt Lake between Gila County and Maricopa County, Arizona.
- Mid-Hudson Bridge, officially Franklin Delano Roosevelt Mid-Hudson Bridge, in Poughkeepsie, New York, United States

== See also ==
- Roosevelt Island Bridge, a lift bridge that connects Roosevelt Island to Queens in New York
