= Roosevelt Middle School =

Roosevelt Middle School may refer to several middle schools in the United States:

- Roosevelt Middle School (Albuquerque, New Mexico)
- Roosevelt Middle School (Bellwood, Illinois)
- Roosevelt Middle School (Eugene, Oregon)
- Roosevelt Middle School (Milwaukee, Wisconsin)
- Roosevelt Middle School (Oakland, California)
- Roosevelt Middle School (River Forest, Illinois)
- Roosevelt Middle School (San Diego, California)
- Roosevelt Middle School (San Francisco, California)
- Roosevelt Middle School (West Orange, New Jersey)

== See also ==
- Roosevelt Elementary School (disambiguation)
- Roosevelt High School (disambiguation)
- Roosevelt Intermediate School
- Roosevelt Junior High School (disambiguation)
- Roosevelt School (disambiguation)
