= Roosevelt Boulevard =

Roosevelt Boulevard may refer to:

- County Route 623 (Cape May County, New Jersey) between Marmora and Ocean City, New Jersey
- Florida State Road 686 in St. Petersburg, Florida
- Roosevelt Boulevard (Jacksonville) in Jacksonville, Florida
- Roosevelt Boulevard (Philadelphia) in Philadelphia, Pennsylvania
