= Roosevelt Oyola =

Ecuadorian footballer (born 1991)

Roosevelt Oyola (born 6 April 1991 in El Guabo Canton) is an Ecuadorian footballer. He currently plays for Club 9 de Octubre in the Campeonato Ecuatoriano de Fútbol.

== Career ==
Oyola began playing football in the Spanish club Elche CF's youth system. He made his professional debut with his home country's Barcelona.

== Teams ==
- Barcelona S.C. 2011–2019
- → Deportivo Cuenca (loan) 2014
- 9 de Octubre 2020–present
