= Roosevelt (musician) =

German singer, songwriter and record producer (born 1990)

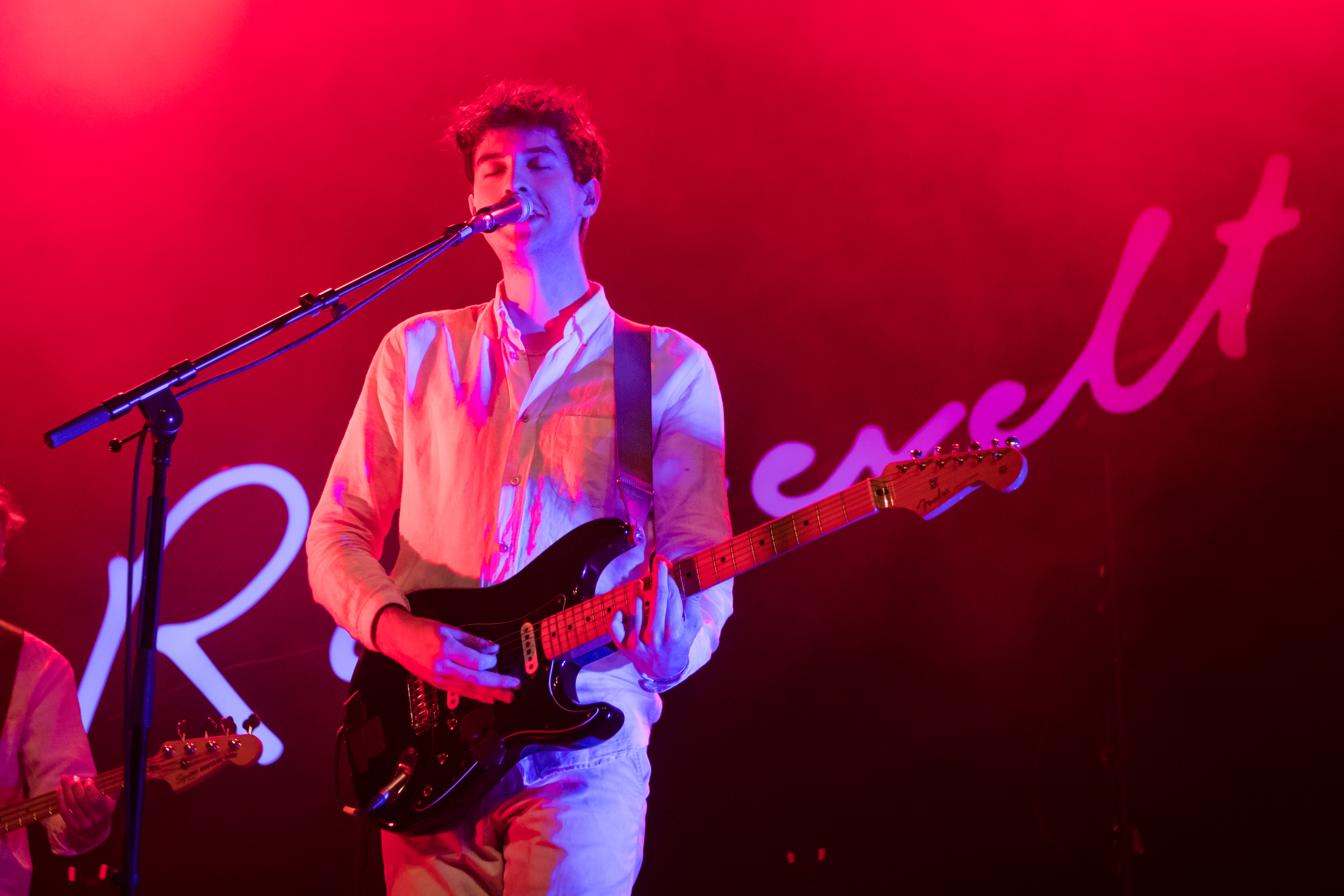
- Roosevelt at WayBackWhen Festival 2017

Background information
- Born: Marius Lauber; 29 September 1990 (age 36); Viersen, North Rhine-Westphalia, Germany
- Genres: Synth-pop, indie electronic, hypnagogic pop
- Labels: Greco-Roman; City Slang

Roosevelt (born Marius Lauber on 29 September 1990) is a German singer, songwriter, DJ and producer.

== Music career ==
=== Solo career ===
His debut EP Elliot was released in 2013. The lead single "Elliot" was named Pitchfork's 'Best New Track'. Roosevelt then released the double A-side "Night Moves"/"Hold On" in 2015 on Greco-Roman, which continued a warm synth-pop, Balearic-influenced sound.

In April 2016, he announced his self-titled debut album, released on 19 August 2016 through Greco-Roman/City Slang. The album's release was preceded by a combined video for two tracks from the album: "Colours" and "Moving On".

In June 2018, he announced a second album, Young Romance. It was released on 28 September 2018. The first single from the album, "Under the Sun", was released on 27 June 2018.

In March 2019, he released "Falling Back" and a cover of Fleetwood Mac's "Everywhere" on W Records. The next year, "Everywhere" was featured in We Bare Bears: The Movie.

On 10 June 2020, Roosevelt released the single "Sign", which was his first original material since the album Young Romance. The release of four other singles ("Echoes", "Feels Right", "Strangers" and "Lovers") followed before his third studio album, Polydans, came out on 26 February 2021.

In July 2023, he announced a fourth album, Embrace, which was released on 22 September 2023. Five singles were released beforehand: "Ordinary Love", "Luna", "Paralyzed", "Rising", and "Forevermore".

=== Remixes and supporting other artists ===
Roosevelt has remixed the likes of Taylor Swift, Glass Animals, Rhye, Poolside, Jax Jones, Truls, Sundara Karma, Luca Vasta and Kakkmaddafakka. The artists he has supported on tour include Hot Chip, Totally Enormous Extinct Dinosaurs and Crystal Fighters.

=== Songs featured in video games ===
Roosevelt's songs have been featured in multiple video games. For example, his songs "Sea" has been featured in Forza Horizon 2 and "Fever" in NBA 2K18, while some other songs, such as "Feels Right", have been featured in games like MLB The Show 24. "Fall Right In" has been featured in EA Sports FC 24.

== Discography ==
=== Albums ===
List of albums, with selected details and chart positions
Title	Album details	Peak chart positions			
Title	Album details	GER	AUT	SWI	US Elec.
Roosevelt	Released: 19 August 2016; Label: Greco Roman / City Slang; Format: CD, digital download, vinyl	27	36	33	11
Young Romance	Released: 28 September 2018; Label: Greco Roman / City Slang; Format: CD, digital download, vinyl	58	—	80	—
Polydans	Released: 26 February 2021; Label: Greco Roman / City Slang; Format: CD, digital download, vinyl	23	—	35	—
Embrace	Released: 22 September 2023; Label: Greco Roman / City Slang; Format: CD, digital download, vinyl	64	—	—	—

=== Singles ===
Year	Title	Label
2012	"Sea"	Greco-Roman
2013	"Elliot"	Greco-Roman
2015	"Hold On/Night Moves"	Greco-Roman / City Slang
2016	"Colours/Moving On" "Fever"	Greco-Roman / City Slang
2017	"Moving On" "Belong"	Greco-Roman / City Slang
2018	"Under the Sun"	Greco-Roman / City Slang
2018	"Forgive" (feat. Washed Out)	Greco-Roman / City Slang
2018	"Shadows"	Greco-Roman / City Slang
2018	"Losing Touch"	Greco-Roman / City Slang
2019	"Falling Back"	W Records
2020	"Sign"	Greco-Roman / City Slang
2020	"Echoes"	Greco-Roman / City Slang
2020	"Feels Right"	Greco-Roman / City Slang
2020	"Strangers"	Greco-Roman / City Slang
2021	"See You Again"	Greco-Roman / City Slang
2021	"On My Mind / About U"	Greco-Roman / City Slang
2023	"Ordinary Love"	Counter Records / Ninja Tune
2023	"Luna"	Counter Records / Ninja Tune
2023	"Paralyzed"	Counter Records / Ninja Tune
2023	"Rising"	Counter Records / Ninja Tune
2023	"Forevermore"	Counter Records / Ninja Tune
2024	"Automatic"	Counter Records / Ninja Tune
2024	"In The Dark"	Counter Records / Ninja Tune

=== Remixes ===
- Kakkmaddafakka – "Someone New" (Roosevelt Remix) (2013)
- COMA – "Les Dilettantes" (Roosevelt Remix) (2013)
- Glass Animals – "Pools" (Roosevelt Remix) (2014)
- Luca Vasta – "Black Tears White Lies" (Roosevelt Remix) (2014)
- Tocotronic – "Rebel Boy" (Roosevelt Remix) (2015)
- Jax Jones – "Yeah Yeah Yeah" (Roosevelt Remix) (2015)
- Chløë Black – "Wild At Heart" (Roosevelt Remix) (2015)
- Blossoms – "Getaway" (Roosevelt Remix) (2016)
- Glass Animals – "Life Itself" (Roosevelt Remix) (2016)
- Sinkane – "Telephone" (Roosevelt Remix) (2016)
- Golf – "Zeit zu Zweit" (Roosevelt Remix) (2016)
- Sundara Karma – "Flame" (Roosevelt Remix) (2016)
- Woman – "Touch" (Roosevelt Remix) (2016)
- Alma – "Chasing High" (Roosevelt Remix) (2017)
- WhoMadeWho – "Dynasty" (Roosevelt Remix) (2017)
- Chvrches – "Get Out" (Roosevelt Remix) (2018)
- The Night Game – "The Outfield" (Roosevelt Remix) (2018)
- Ariana and the Rose – "Love You Lately" (Roosevelt Remix) (2018)
- Rhye – "Summer Days" (Roosevelt Remix) (2018)
- Charlotte Gainsbourg – "Bombs Away" (Roosevelt Remix) (2019)
- Josin – "In the Blank Space" (Roosevelt Remix) (2019)
- Milck – "Gold" (Roosevelt Remix) (2020)
- Purple Disco Machine – "Hypnotized" (Roosevelt Remix) (2020)
- Bad Sounds – "Move Into Me" (feat. Broods) (Roosevelt Remix) (2021)
- Orlando Weeks – "Big Skies, Silly Faces" (Roosevelt Remix) (2021)
- The Wombats – "If You Ever Leave, I'm Coming With You" (Roosevelt Remix) (2021)
- Cro – "EASY X" (Roosevelt Remix) (2021)
- Selah Sue – "Pills" (Roosevelt Remix) (2022)
- Flight Facilities – "Forever" (feat. Broods) (Roosevelt Remix) (2022)
- Balthazar – "Linger On" (Roosevelt Remix) (2022)
- José Gonzalez – "Swing" (Roosevelt Remix) (2022)
- Poolside – "Harvest Moon" (Roosevelt Remix) (2022)
- Roy Bianco & Die Abbrunzati Boys – "Giro" (Roosevelt Remix) (2022)
- Taylor Swift – "Anti-Hero" (Roosevelt Remix) (2022)
- Juli – "Der Sommer ist vorbei" (Roosevelt Remix) (2023)
- Anna of the North – "Swirl" (Roosevelt Remix) (2023)
- William Prince – "When You Miss Someone" (Roosevelt Remix) (2024)
- Fil Bo Riva – "Lost in Life" (Roosevelt Remix) (2024)
- Tommy Newport – "Tangerine" (Roosevelt Remix) (2024)
- Casper Caan – "H.A.O.U." (Roosevelt Remix) (2024)
- Rikas – "Bike in L.A." (Roosevelt Remix) (2025)
- The Wombats – "Sorry I'm Late, I Didn't Want To Come" (Roosevelt Remix) (2025)
- Claptone – "Turn Up The Love" (feat. Crystal Fighters) (Roosevelt Remix) (2025)

=== Compilations ===
Year	Contribution	Album	Label
2013	Montreal	Electronic Beats 2013	Electronic Beats
2014	Elliot	Majestic Casual Chapter 2	Kontor Records
2014	Montreal	Trip Mode	Kitsuné Maison

=== Music videos ===
Title	Year	Director(s)	Ref.
"Sea"	2012	Jem Goulding	
"Montreal"	2013	Roosevelt	
"Elliot"	2013	Hot Mess	
"Night Moves"	2015	Sophia Ray	
"Hold On"	2015	Fabian Podeszwa	
"Colours / Moving On"	2016	Elliott Arndt	
"Fever"	2016	Elliott Arndt	
"Belong"	2016	Andres Fouché & Martijn Bosgraaf	
"Moving On"	2017	Hector Prats	
"Under the Sun"	2018	Unknown	
"Shadows"	2018	Playground	
"Losing Touch"	2018	Luke Bather	
"Sign"	2020	Ohad Ben-Moshe	
"Feels Right"	2020	Felix Aaron	
"See You Again"	2021	Hector Prats	
