= Roosevelt Township =

Roosevelt Township may refer to:

- Roosevelt Township, Pocahontas County, Iowa, in Pocahontas County, Iowa
- Roosevelt Township, Decatur County, Kansas
- Roosevelt Township, Beltrami County, Minnesota
- Roosevelt Township, Crow Wing County, Minnesota
- Roosevelt Township, Renville County, North Dakota, in Renville County, North Dakota
