= Roosevelt Municipal Golf Course =

Golf course in Los Angeles

- Location within the United States Location within California
- 34.118976°N 118.293799°W

Club information
- Location: Griffith Park; 2650 N. Vermont Avenue; Los Angeles, California, 90027
- Established: 1964, 62 years ago
- Owner: City of Los Angeles
- Tota holes: 9
- Website: Official website
- Par: 33
- Length: 2,478 yards (2,266 m)
- Course rating: 62.6
- Slope rating: 110

The Roosevelt Municipal Golf Course is a 9-hole golf course located in the Griffith Park area of Los Angeles, California.

It currently measures 2,478 yards (2,266 m) from the back tees.
