= Fort Lesley J. McNair =

United States Army post in Washington, D.C.

- Part of Joint Base Myer–Henderson Hall
- Buzzard Point, Washington, D.C.
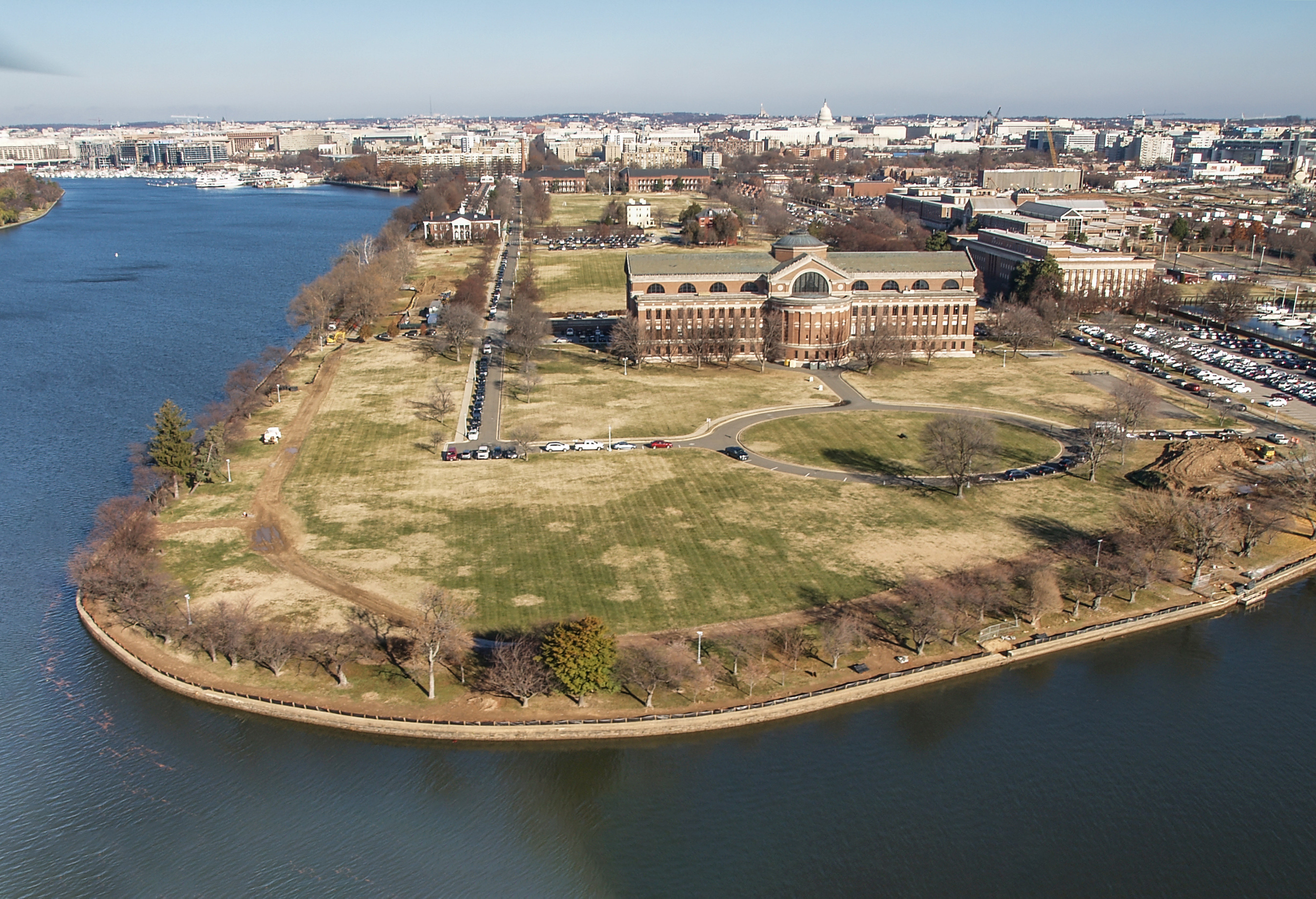
- Fort McNair peninsula from the air

Site information
- Type: Military base
- Controlled by: United States Army: United States Army Military District of Washington
- Open to the public: No
- Website: home.army.mil/jbmhh

Location
- Location within the District of Columbia
- Coordinates: 38.867°N 77.016°W

Site history
- Architect: Pierre Charles L'Enfant
- In use: 1791–present
- Fate: Incorporated into Joint Base Myer–Henderson Hall

Garrison information
- Garrison: Military District of Washington
- Occupants: Inter-American Defense College; National Defense University

Fort Lesley J. McNair, also historically known as the Washington Arsenal, is a United States Army post located on the tip of Buzzard Point, the peninsula that lies at the confluence of the Potomac River and the Anacostia River in Washington, D.C. To the peninsula's west is the Washington Channel, while the Anacostia River is on its south side. The fort has been an army post for more than 200 years, third in length of service, after the United States Military Academy at West Point and the Carlisle Barracks. The fort is named for General Lesley James McNair, who was killed in action by friendly fire in Normandy, France during World War II.

== History ==
=== Early history ===
The military reservation was established in 1791, on about 28 acres (110,000 m^{2}) at the tip of Greenleaf Point. Major Pierre Charles L'Enfant included it in his plans for Washington, the Federal City, as a significant site for the capital defense. (Note: L'Enfant identified himself as "Peter Charles L'Enfant" during most of his life while residing in the United States. He wrote this name on his "Plan of the city intended for the permanent seat of the government of t(he) United States ...." (Washington, D.C.) and on other legal documents. However, during the early 1900s, a French ambassador to the U.S., Jean Jules Jusserand, popularized the use of L'Enfant's birth name, "Pierre Charles L'Enfant". (See: Bowling (2002).) The National Park Service identifies L'Enfant as Major Peter Charles L'Enfant and as Major Pierre (Peter) Charles L'Enfant on its website. The United States Code states in 40 U.S.C. 3309: "(a) In General.—The purposes of this chapter shall be carried out in the District of Columbia as nearly as may be practicable in harmony with the plan of Peter Charles L'Enfant.") On L'Enfant's orders, Andre Villard, a French follower of Marquis de Lafayette, placed a one-gun battery on the site. In 1795, the site became one of the first two United States arsenals.

An arsenal first occupied the site, and defenses were built in 1794. However, the fortifications did not halt the invasion of British forces in 1814, who burned down many public government buildings in Washington, D.C., during the War of 1812. Soldiers at the arsenal evacuated north with as much gunpowder as they could carry, hiding the rest in a well as the British soldiers came up the Potomac River after burning the Capitol. About 47 British soldiers found the powder magazines they had come to destroy were empty. An accidental explosion when a spark ignited an open barrel of black powder, and "a tremendous explosion ensued," a doctor at the scene reported, "whereby the officers and about 30 of the men were killed and the rest most shockingly mangled."

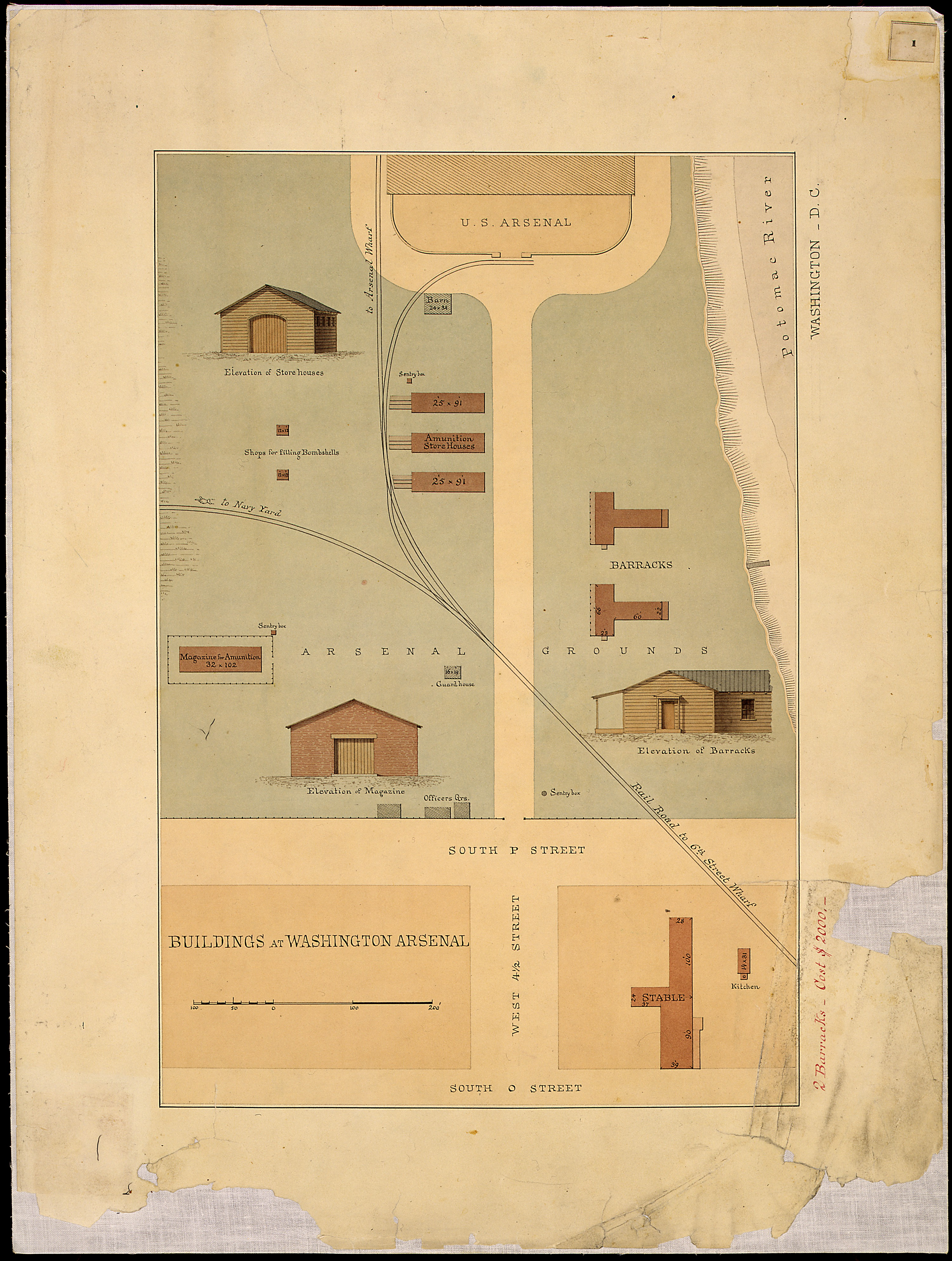
Buildings at Washington Arsenal (now Fort Lesley J. McNair), Washington, D.C. (Ground plan and views.) 1861–1865

The remaining soldiers destroyed the arsenal buildings, but the facilities were rebuilt from 1815 to 1821. Eight buildings were arranged around a quadrangle and named the Washington Arsenal. In the early 1830s, four acres of marshland were reclaimed and added to the arsenal. A seawall and additional buildings were constructed. Between 1825 and 1831, the Washington Arsenal penitentiary, constructed adjacent to the main arsenal buildings, included a three-story block of cells and administrative buildings, as well as a shoe factory for teaching prisoners a trade. In 1857, the federal government purchased additional land for the site. By 1860, the arsenal had used one of the first steam presses, developed the first automatic machine for manufacturing percussive caps, and experimented with the Hale Rocket. A large civilian workforce manufactured ammunition at the arsenal, and the site included a large military hospital.

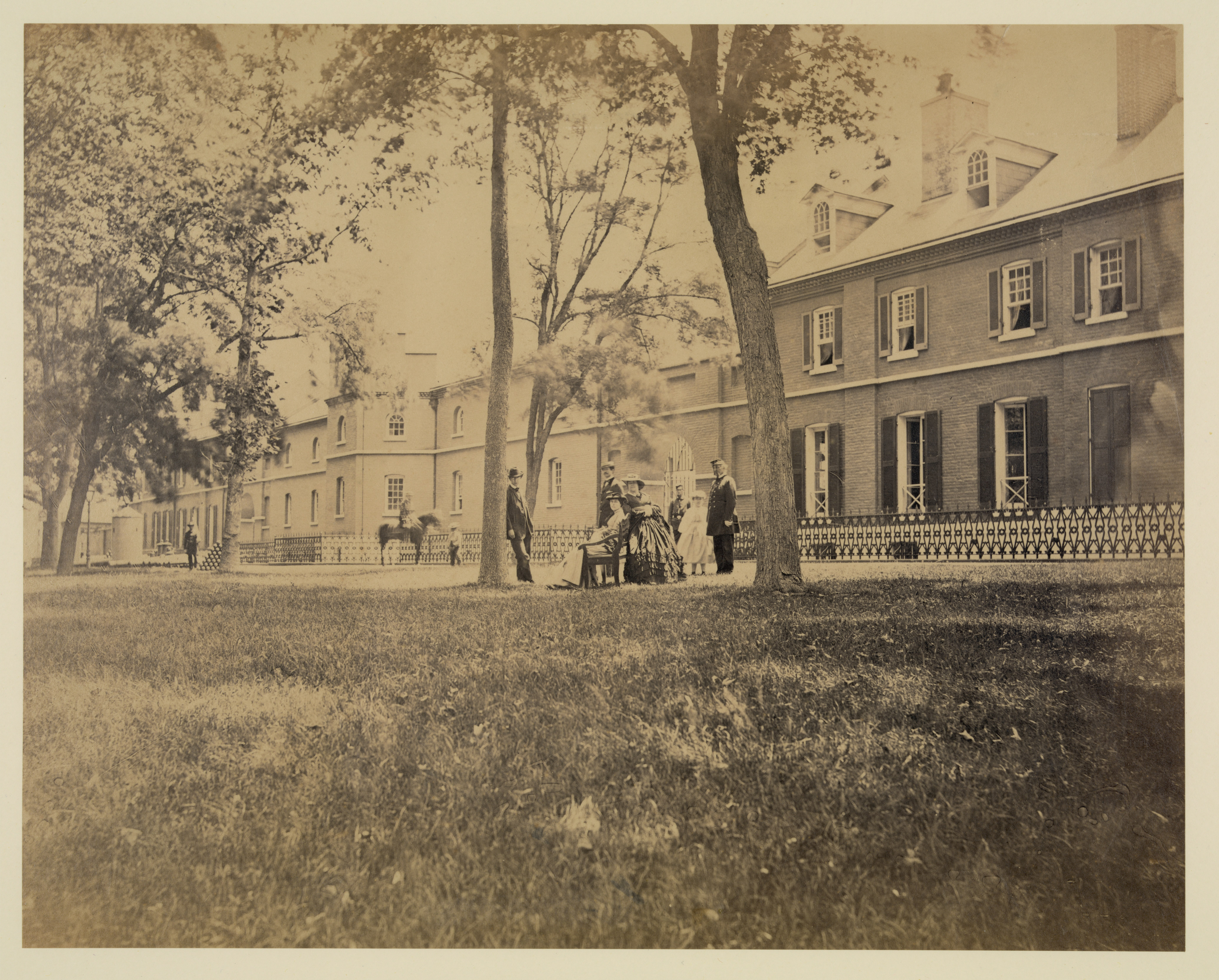
Arsenal, north front. Interior court - group of officers in foreground

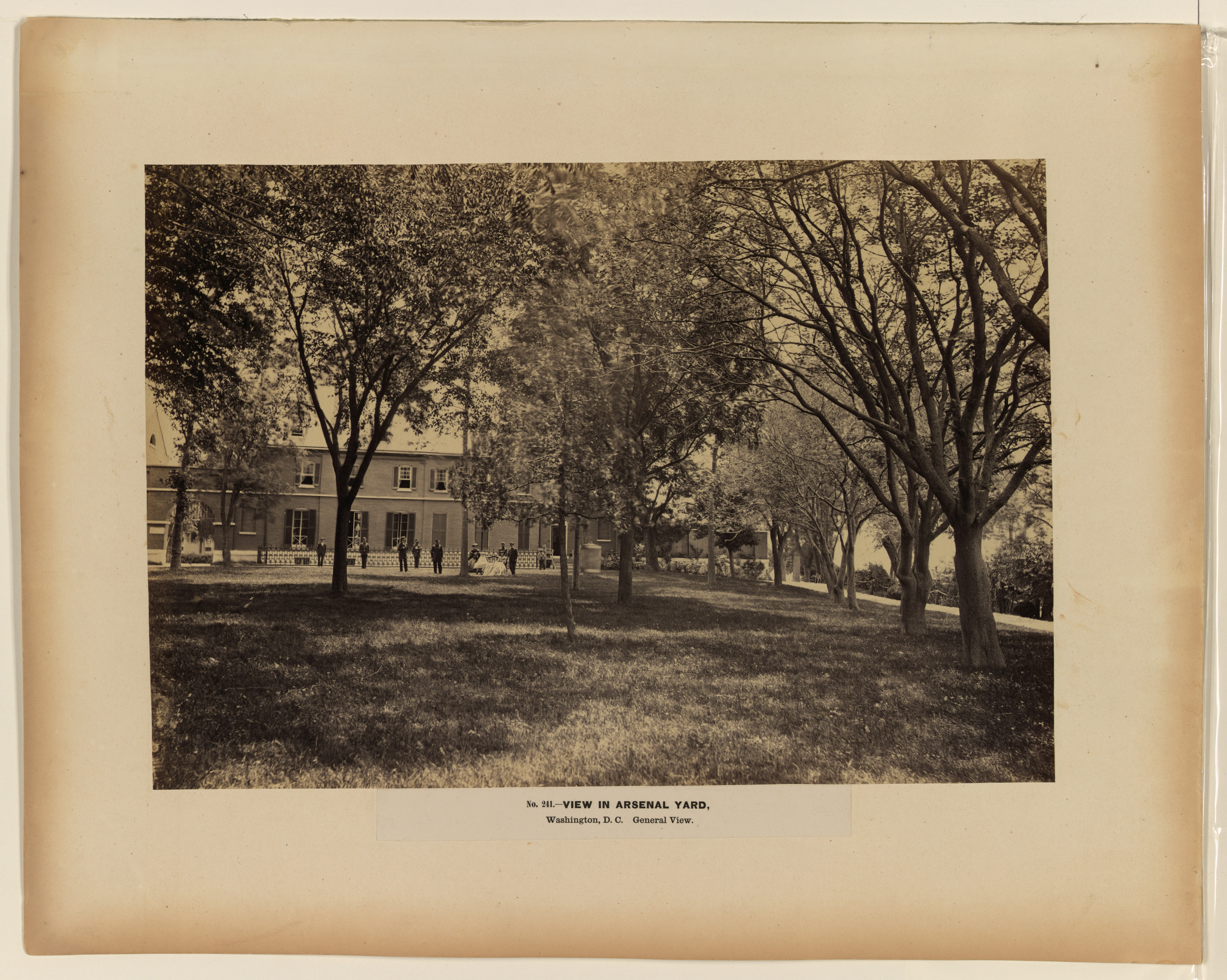
View in Arsenal Yard, general view

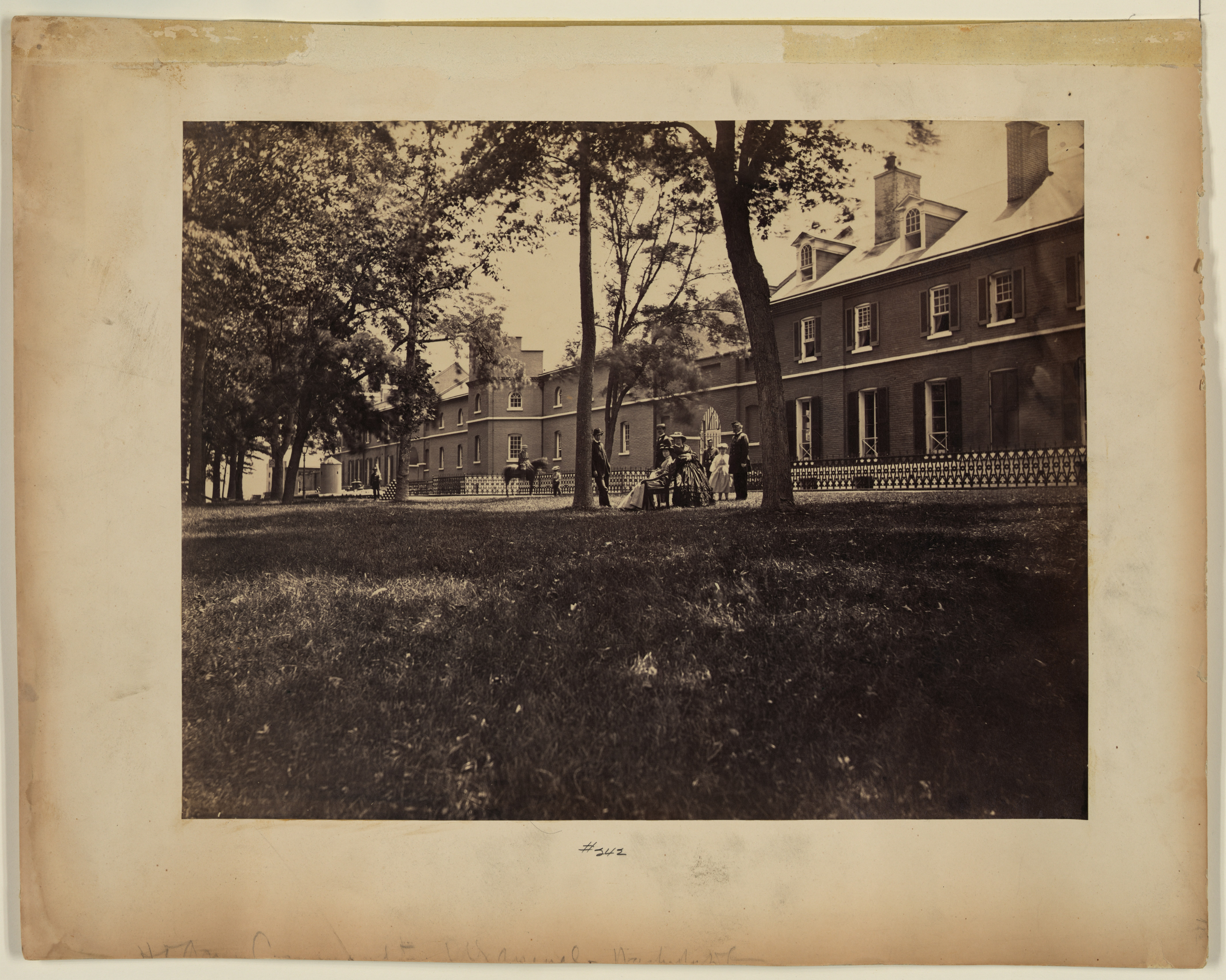
U.S. Arsenal, Washington, D.C., north front, interior court

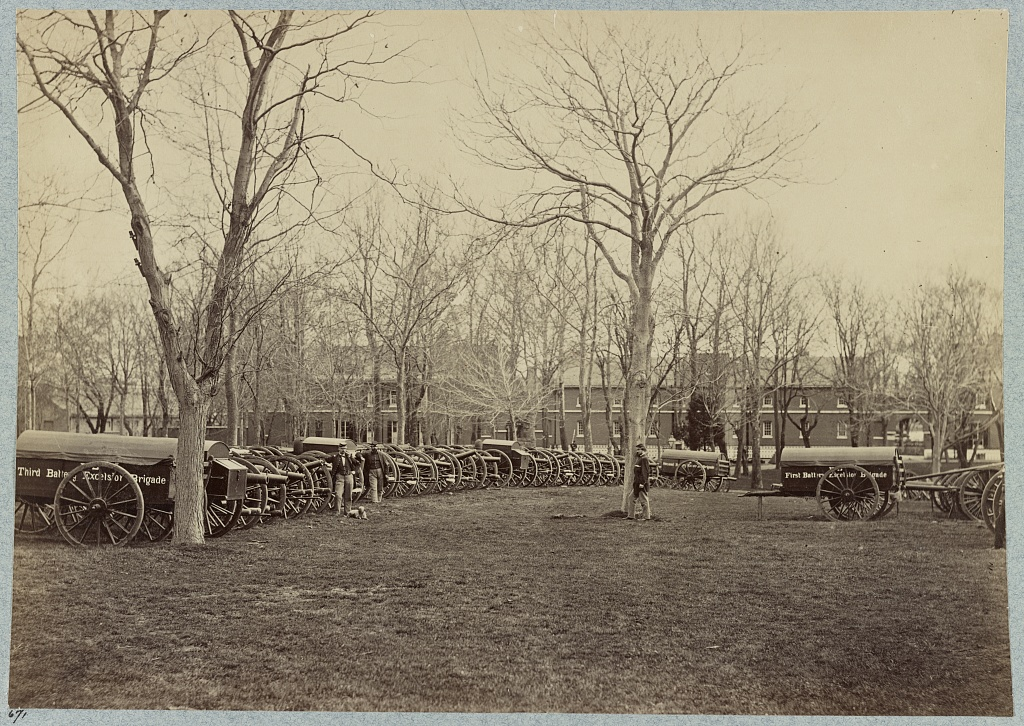
Cannons in 1862 in the Washington Arsenal

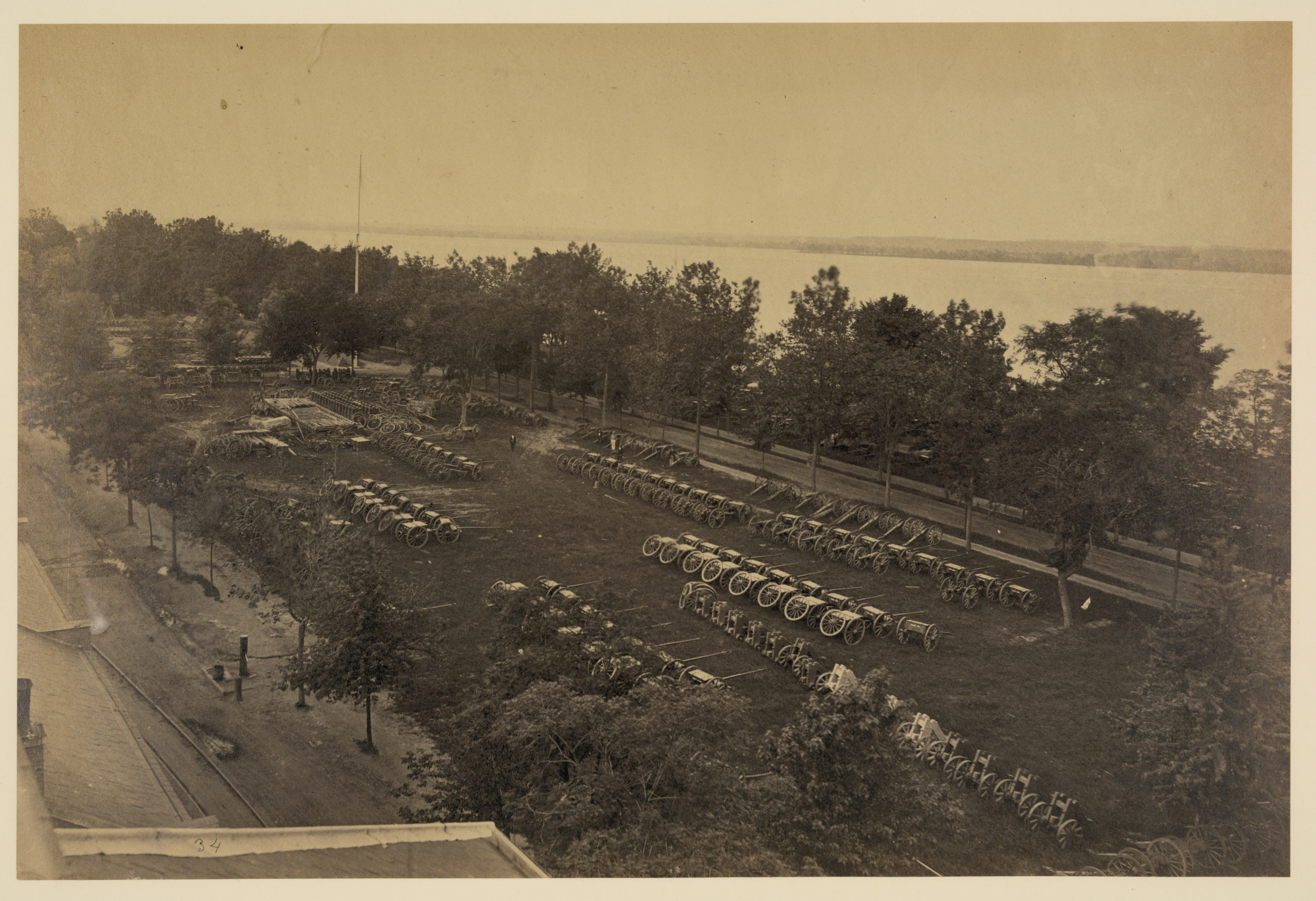
View from the roof of model arsenal

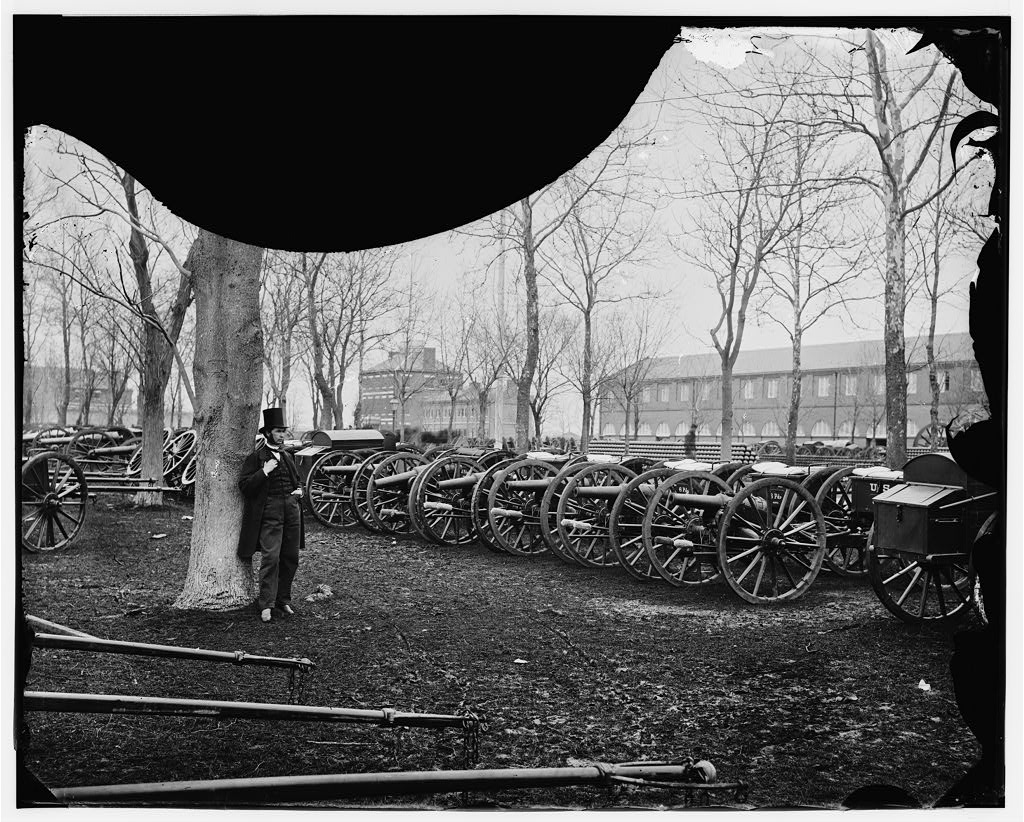
Park of Wiard guns at the arsenal

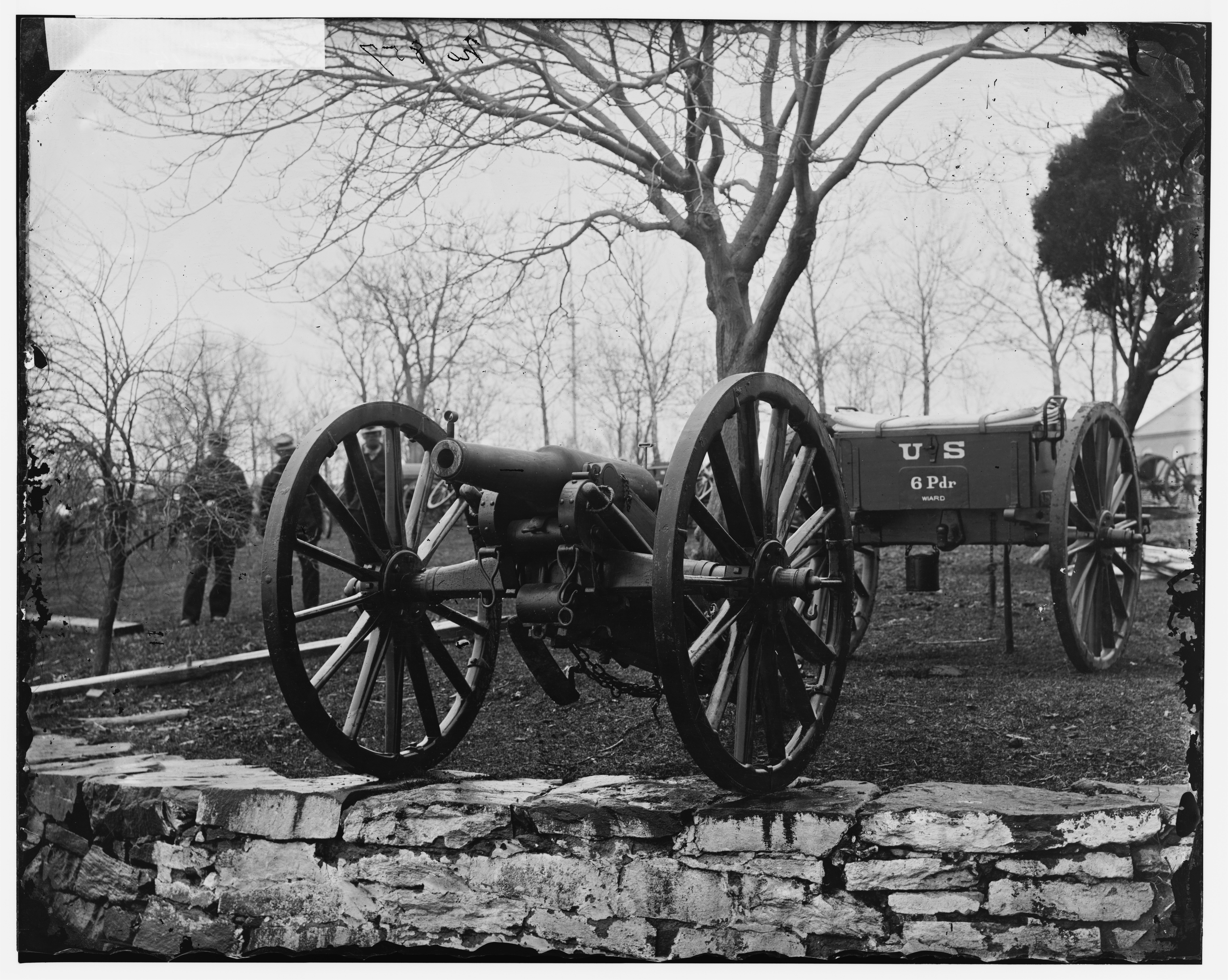
A Wiard 6-pdr gun at the arsenal

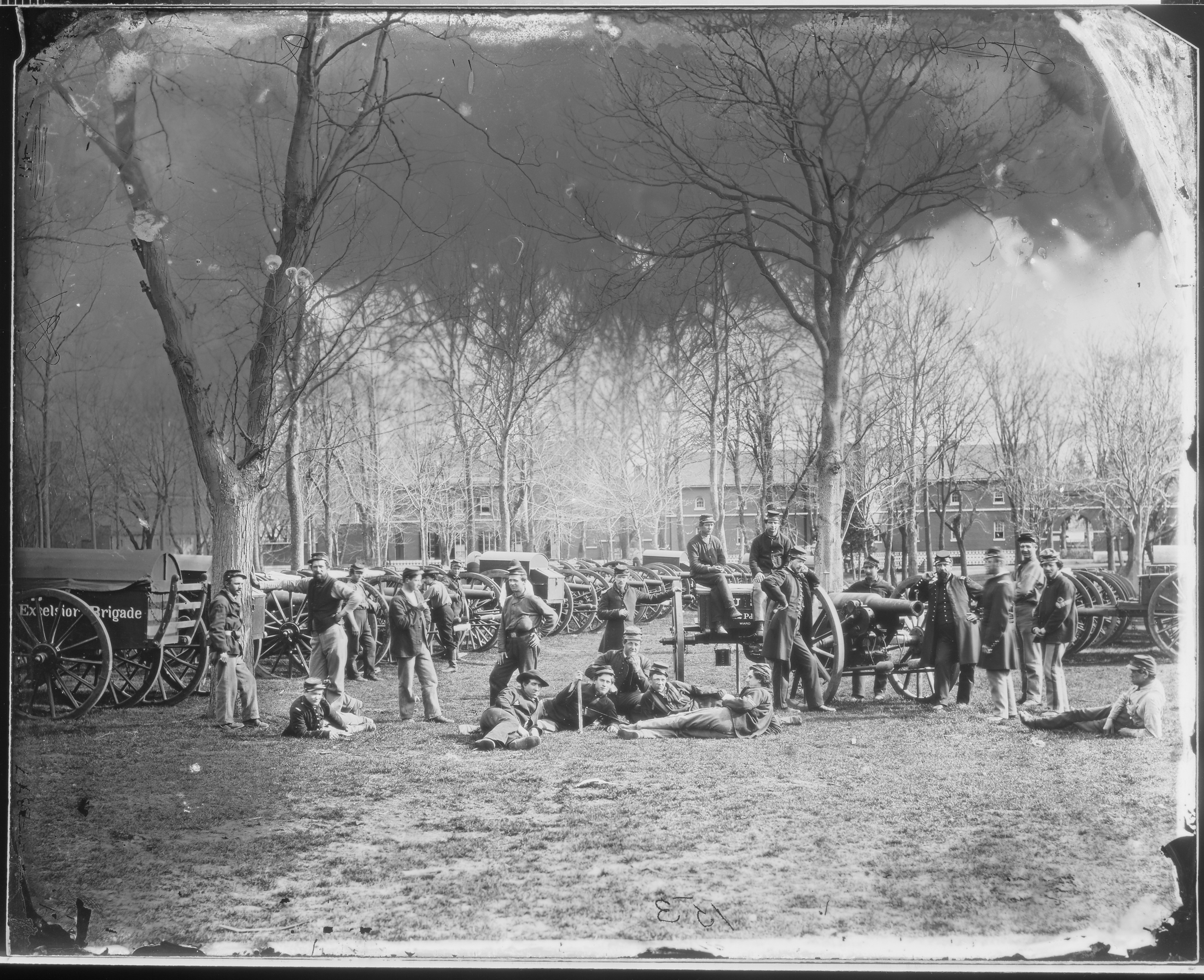
Wiard 6 lb. guns, Washington arsenal. Excelsior brigade

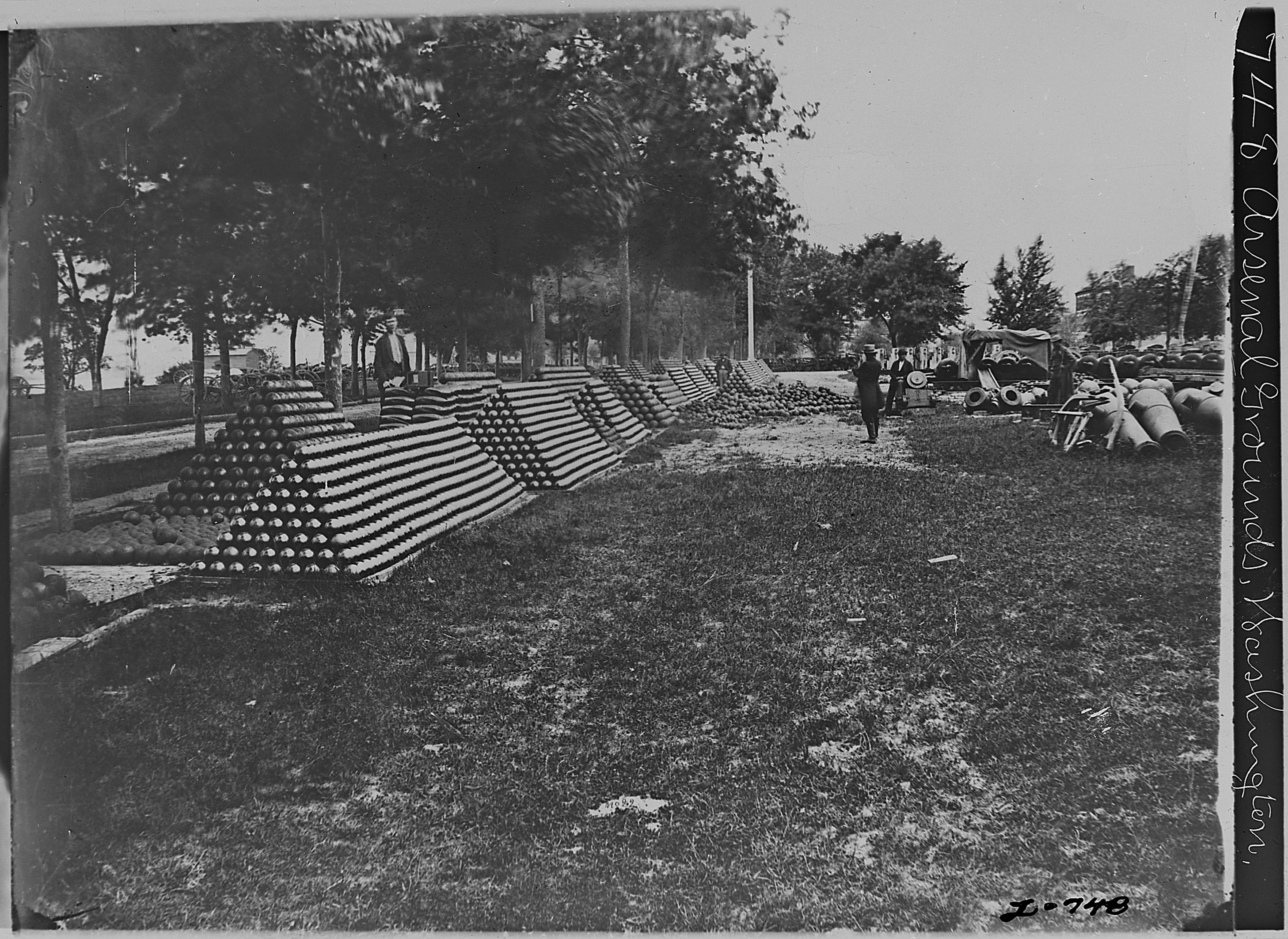
Arsenal Grounds

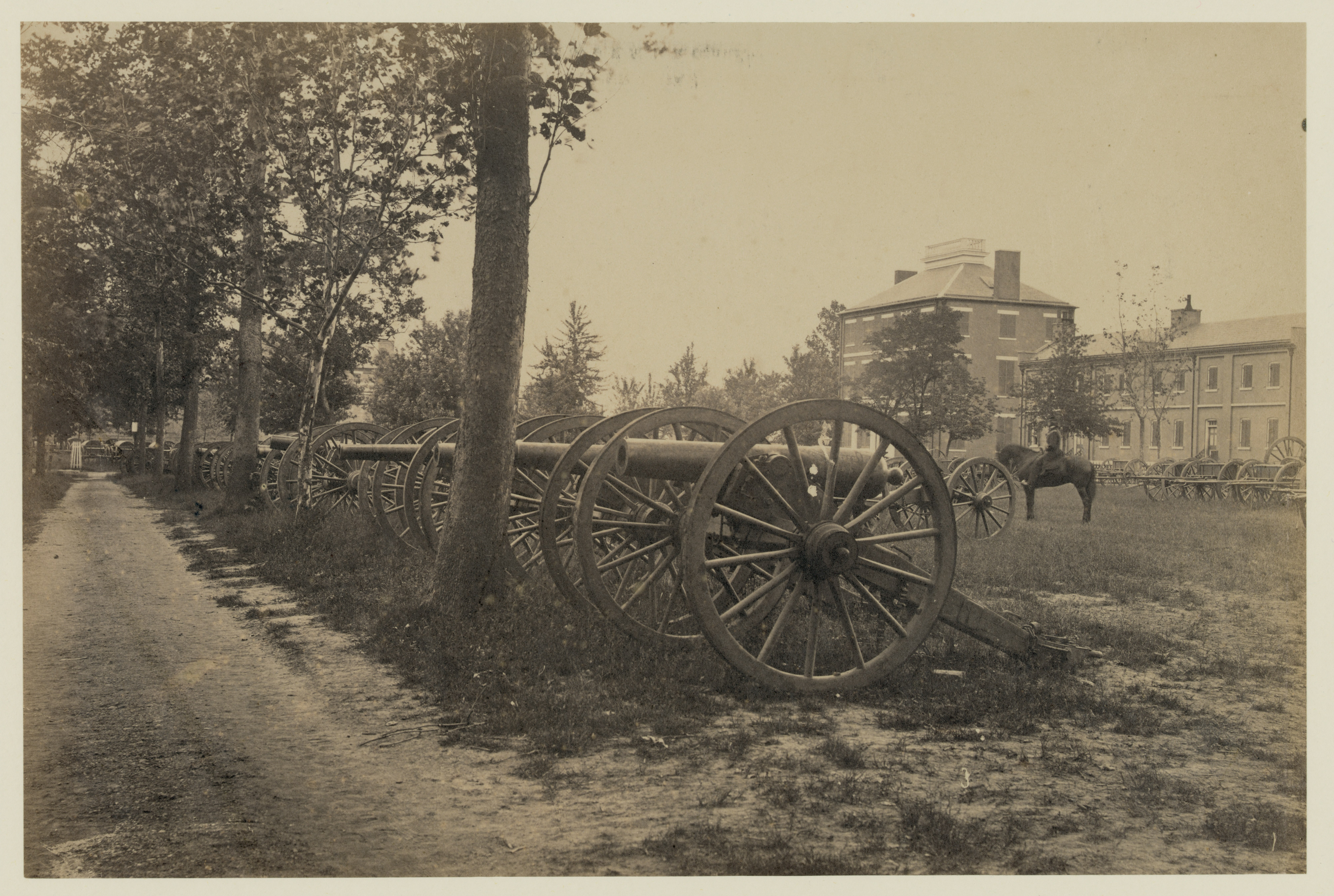
Batteries of field pieces in the arsenal

=== The Civil War ===
During the Civil War, women worked in an ammunition factory at the Washington Arsenal, which served the Union. Many lower-class women—including Irish immigrants—needed wages, especially after male relatives went to war. Women were believed to have nimble fingers, attention to detail, and a tendency toward neatness, all suitable for rolling, pinching, tying, and bundling cartridges with bullets and black powder. Wounded Civil War soldiers were also treated at the Arsenal in a hospital next to the penitentiary that was built before the war in 1857.

==== Accident ====
On June 17, 1864, fireworks left in the sun outside a cartridge room ignited, killing twenty-one women, many of whom burned to death in flammable hoop skirts. The War Department paid for their funerals, and President Abraham Lincoln attended the joint funeral procession. A monument at Congressional Cemetery commemorates these women. In memory of the many Irish victims, the Irish foreign minister Eamon Gilmore laid a wreath at the Congressional Cemetery memorial in 2014 to commemorate the accident's 150th anniversary.

==== Lincoln conspirators' trial ====
Following the defeat and surrender of the Confederate States of America in the spring of 1865 to end the war, John Wilkes Booth assassinated Lincoln in retribution. Following Booth's death at the hands of Federal troops in Port Royal, Virginia, his conspirators were then apprehended and imprisoned in the Washington Arsenal penitentiary. After being found guilty by a military tribunal, four were hanged in the yard of the penitentiary, and the rest received prison sentences. Among those hanged at what would become Fort McNair was Mary Surratt, the first woman ever executed under federal orders. The military tribunal tried the conspirators in a complex that is known as Ulysses S. Grant Hall. This hall periodically holds public open houses. Each quarter of the hall is open to the public, allowing visitors to tour the courtroom and learn more about the trials.

The arsenal was closed in 1881, and the post was transferred to the Quartermaster Corps.

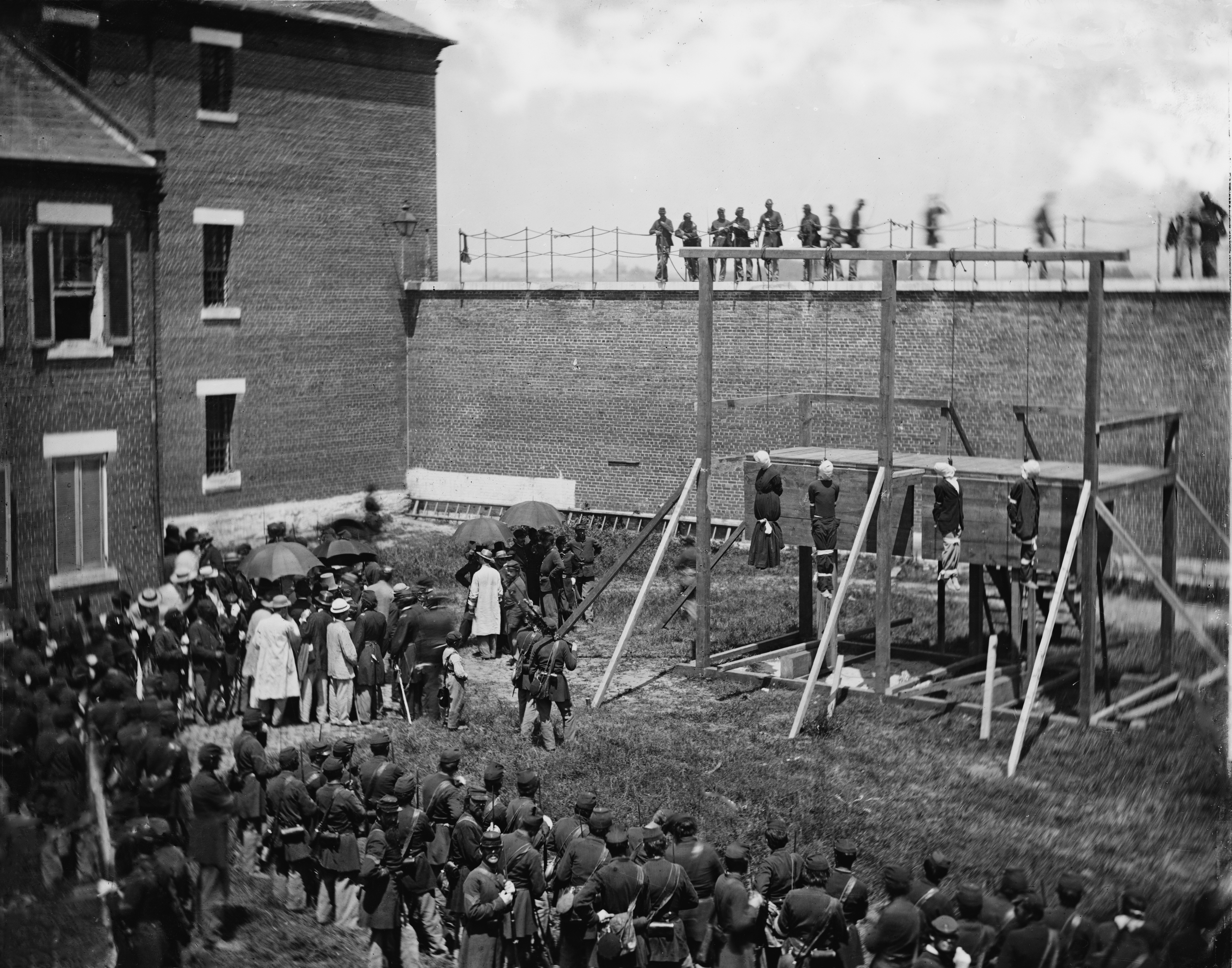
Execution of Mary Surratt, Lewis Powell, David Herold, and George Atzerodt on July 7, 1865

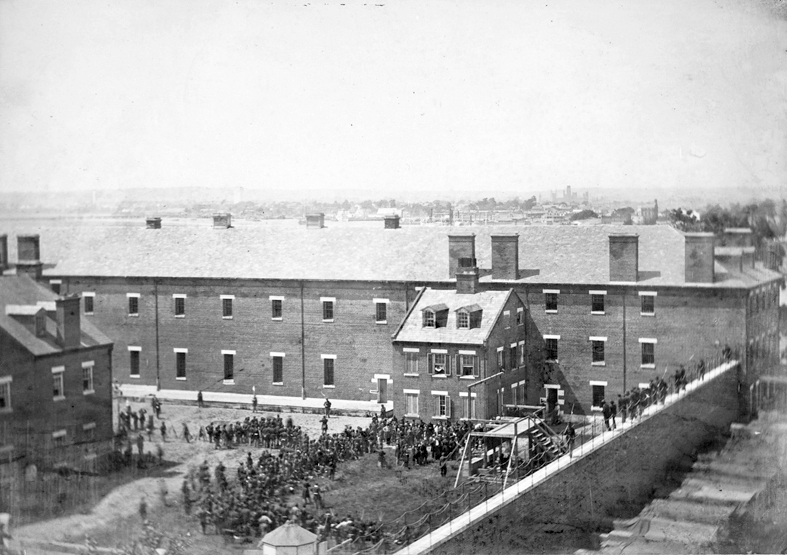
An alternate view of the execution, taken from the roof of the arsenal

=== Walter Reed ===
A general hospital, the predecessor to the Walter Reed Army Medical Center, was located at the post from 1898 until 1909. Major Walter Reed found the area's marshlands an excellent site for his research on malaria. Reed's work contributed to the discovery of the cause of yellow fever. Reed died of peritonitis after an appendectomy at the post in 1902. The post dispensary and the visiting officers' quarters now occupy the buildings where Reed worked and died.

=== 20th century ===
From December 1901 to March 1903, Engineer officer Frederic Vaughan Abbot served on a panel that reported positively on the feasibility of establishing the United States Army War College at Washington Barracks and reconstructing the site so it could host the headquarters of the Chief of Engineers and the Engineer School. In 1904, the War College's first classes were conducted at Roosevelt Hall, the iconic building designed by the architectural firm of McKim, Mead and White. About 90% of the present buildings on the post's 100 acres (0.40 km^{2}) were built, reconstructed, or remodeled by 1908. During World War I, Washington Barracks and the sub‑posts at Camp Leach and Camp A. A. Humphreys, were commanded by Abbot and were home to the school for Engineer officers and the site for enlisting and organizing divisional Engineer regiments for service in France.

The Army Industrial College was founded at McNair in 1924 to prepare officers for high-level posts in Army supply organizations and study industrial mobilization. It evolved into the Industrial College of the Armed Forces. The post was renamed Fort Humphreys in 1935 – a name previously assigned to today's Fort Belvoir. The Army War College was reorganized as the Army-Navy Staff College in 1943 and became the National War College in 1946. The two colleges became the National Defense University in 1976.

The post was renamed in 1948 to honor Lieutenant General Lesley J. McNair, commander of Army Ground Forces during World War II, who was headquartered at the post and was killed during Operation Cobra near Saint-Lô, France, on July 25, 1944. He was killed in an infamous friendly fire incident when errant bombs of the Eighth Air Force fell on the positions of 2nd Battalion, 120th Infantry, where McNair was observing the fighting. Fort McNair has been the headquarters of the Military District of Washington since 1966.

=== Proposed buffer zone ===
In 2020, the Department of Defense and Army Corps of Engineers proposed a permanent restricted area of about 250 to 500 feet (76 to 152 m) into the Washington Channel along the fort's western bank outlined by buoys and warning signs. This proposal was met with resistance from D.C. city leaders, as it would limit access to up to half of the heavily used waterway. In January 2021, the NSA intercepted communications from the Iranian Revolutionary Guard that threatened mounting suicide boat attacks on Fort McNair similar to those used in the USS Cole bombing. The communications also revealed threats to kill Vice Chief of Staff of the Army General Joseph M. Martin and plans to infiltrate and surveil the installation. This contributed to calls to establish a buffer zone and to continue increasing security. During a March 2021 House Transportation & Infrastructure hearing on a bill prohibiting such a restriction on the Channel, it was noted that the rule, which did not propose the construction of a fence or blast wall, seemed designed to safeguard the views of "rich generals' houses".

=== 6 January 2021, United States Capitol attack ===
During the January 6 United States Capitol attack, the senior Congressional leadership was evacuated from the Capitol building to Fort McNair, about two miles (3.2 km) away. The Democratic Party leaders evacuated included House Speaker Nancy Pelosi and her senior associates Steny Hoyer and James Clyburn. Incoming Senate Majority Leader Chuck Schumer was also evacuated.

Senior Senate Republicans evacuated to Fort McNair included outgoing Senate Majority Leader Mitch McConnell and Senators Chuck Grassley and John Thune. House Republican leaders evacuated to Fort McNair included House Minority Leader Kevin McCarthy and Steve Scalise.

== Current status ==
Fort McNair is part of the Joint Base Myer–Henderson Hall, the headquarters of the Army's Military District of Washington, and serves as home to the National Defense University, as well as the official residence of the Vice Chief of Staff of the United States Army.

The fort's flat greenspace, which is only three miles from the White House, is frequently used as a landing zone for Marine One when the White House South Lawn is unavailable for that purpose.

== Tenants ==
=== National Defense University (NDU) ===
The National Defense University represents a significant concentration of the defense community's intellectual resources. Initially established in 1976, the university includes the National War College and the Dwight D. Eisenhower School for National Security and Resource Strategy (formerly the Industrial College of the Armed Forces) at Fort McNair, and the Joint Forces Staff College in Norfolk, Virginia. These and other schools are separate entities, but their close affiliation enhances the exchange of faculty expertise and educational resources, promotes interaction among students and faculty, and reduces administrative costs. The National War College and the Eisenhower School concentrate on preparing civilian and military professionals in national security strategy, decision-making, joint and combined warfare, and the resource component of national strategy. The Joint Forces Staff College, established under the Joint Chiefs of Staff in 1946, prepares selected officers for joint and combined duty.

In 1990, the Information Resources Management College was formed as the capstone institution for Defense Information Resource Management education. As such, it provides graduate-level courses in information resources management. The National Defense University also features a first-rate research capability through the Institute for National Strategic Studies. This institute, established in 1984, conducts independent policy analyses and develops policy and strategy alternatives. It also includes a War Gaming and Simulation Center and the NDU Press.

The university has several other educational programs. These include the Capstone program for general- and flag-officer selectees; the International Fellows program, which brings to NDU almost 100 participants from 50 countries; and the Reserve Components National Security Course, which offers military education to senior officers of the armed forces.

=== Inter-American Defense College (IADC) ===
The Inter-American Defense College is an advanced-studies institute for senior officers of the 25-member nations of the Inter-American Defense Board. Up to three students of the rank of colonel or the equivalent may be sent to the college by each member nation. The students' backgrounds must qualify them to participate in solving hemispheric defense problems.

The officers study world alliances and the international situation, the inter-American system and its role, strategic concepts of war, and engage in a planning exercise for hemispheric defense. The college has been at Fort McNair since 1962.

=== United States Army Center of Military History (CMH) ===
In September 1998, the United States Army Center of Military History moved from rented offices in Washington, D.C., to Fort McNair, in historically preserved quarters remodeled from its previous use as a commissary and, before that, as Fort McNair's stables. The center dates back to the creation of the Army General Staff historical branch in July 1943 and to the gathering of professional historians, translators, editors, and cartographers to record the history of World War II. That effort led to a monumental 79-volume series known as the "Green Books."

Today, the center operates through four divisions. The histories division is the one most involved in writing the histories and providing historical research support to the Army staff. The field program and historical services guides document work done at various posts and installations, as well as the work of deployed historical detachments for Army operations, ensuring that historical information is comprehensive and factual.

Another division oversees the Army museum system and preserves artifacts and artwork that are the Army's historical treasures. One such museum, The Old Guard Museum, was located at Fort Myer until it was closed.

== See also ==
- Roosevelt Hall (National War College)
