= Roosevelt Elementary School (Philadelphia) =

- Theodore Roosevelt Junior High School
- U.S. National Register of Historic Places
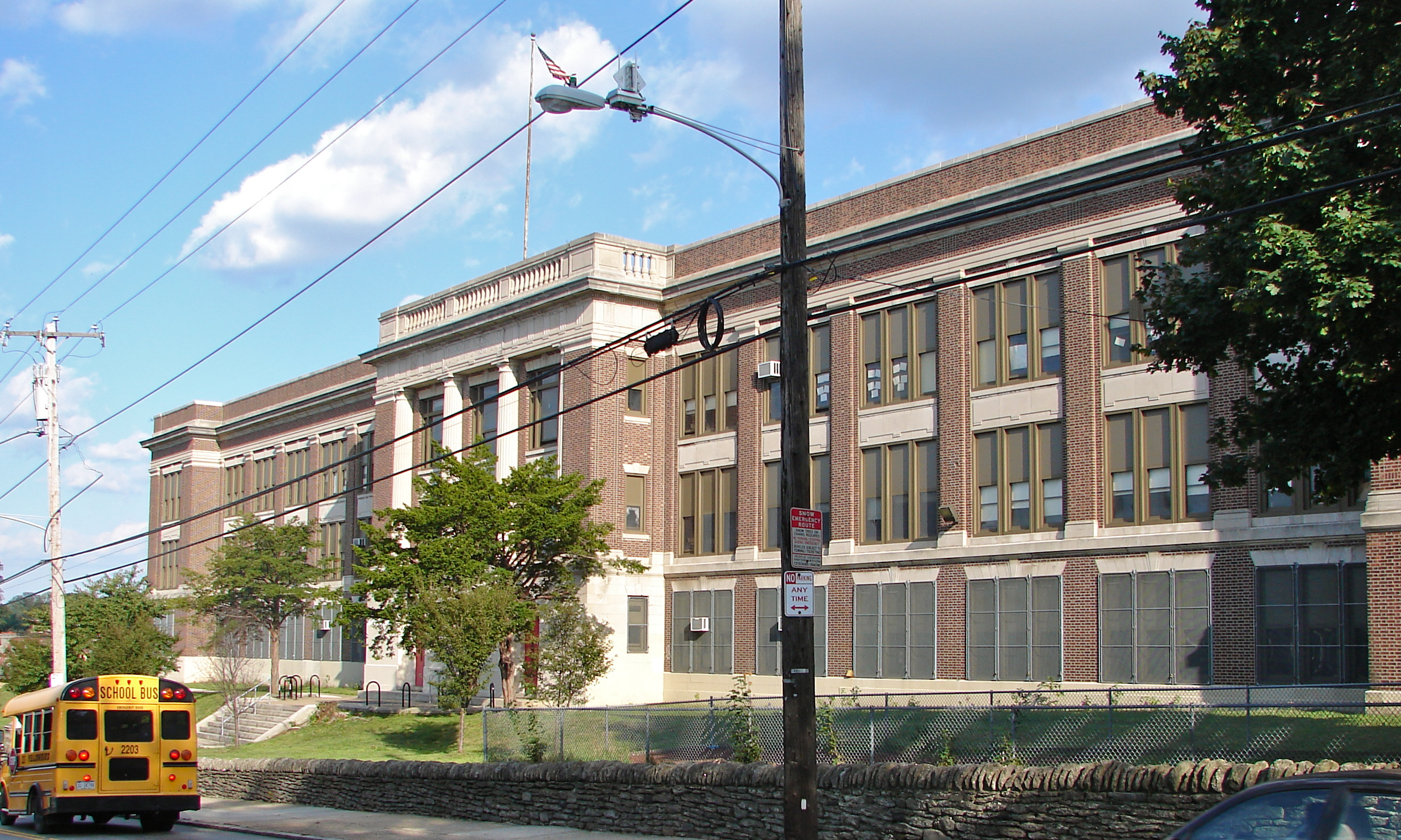
- Theodore Roosevelt Junior High School, October 2010

- Location within Philadelphia Location within Pennsylvania Location within the United States
- Location: 430 E. Washington Ln., Philadelphia, Pennsylvania
- Coordinates: 40.0483°N 75.1752°W
- Area: 5 acres (2.0 ha)
- Built: 1922–1924
- Architect: Irwin T. Catharine
- Architectural style: Colonial Revival
- MPS: Philadelphia Public Schools TR
- NRHP reference No.: 88002317
- Added to NRHP: November 18, 1988

Roosevelt Elementary School is a historic American K–8 school in the Morton neighborhood of Philadelphia, Pennsylvania. It is part of the School District of Philadelphia.

The building was added to the National Register of Historic Places in 1988.

== History and architectural features ==
This building was designed by Irwin T. Catharine and built between 1922 and 1924. It is a three-story, seventeen-bay, brick building that sits on a raised basement. Created in the Colonial Revival style, it features a central projecting entrance pavilion of brick and stone, with stone pilasters, and a stone cornice and brick parapet. The school was named for President Theodore Roosevelt.

In the spring of 2013, this school had roughly 320 students in grades seven and eight. That year, Robert Fulton Elementary School, less than 1 mile (1.6 km) walking distance, closed, and its students, from the former school zone in the center of Germantown, were moved to Roosevelt.

Principal Byron Ryan began his term in the fall of 2013.
