= SS President Roosevelt =

SS President Roosevelt may refer to:

- SS President Roosevelt (1921), a Design 1029 ship launched as Peninsula State; renamed President Pierce in May 1922, then President Roosevelt in August 1922; during World War II served the United States Army as USAT Joseph T. Dickman and the United States Navy as USS Joseph T. Dickman (AP-/APA-13); scrapped in 1948
- SS President Roosevelt (1944), a later name for the U.S. Navy transport USS General W. P. Richardson (AP-118) built during World War II; served as a passenger ship under a variety of names, including President Roosevelt (1961–1970); scrapped in 2004

== See also ==
- SS Roosevelt (1905), an American steamer best known for supporting Robert Peary′s expeditions to the Arctic
