= Roosevelt High School =

Roosevelt High School may refer to:

== Eleanor Roosevelt ==
- Eleanor Roosevelt High School (California), Eastvale, California
- Eleanor Roosevelt High School (Maryland)
- Eleanor Roosevelt High School (New York City)
- Eleanor Roosevelt School, Warm Springs, Georgia

== Franklin Delano Roosevelt ==
- Franklin Delano Roosevelt High School (Hyde Park, New York)
- Franklin Delano Roosevelt High School (New York City)
- Franklin D. Roosevelt High School (Texas), Dallas, Texas

== Theodore Roosevelt ==
- Theodore Roosevelt College and Career Academy, Gary, Indiana; formerly known as Theodore Roosevelt High School
- Theodore Roosevelt High School (Fresno, California)
- Theodore Roosevelt High School (Los Angeles, California)
- Theodore Roosevelt High School (Colorado)
- President Theodore Roosevelt High School, Honolulu, Hawaii
- Theodore Roosevelt High School (Illinois), Chicago, Illinois
- Theodore Roosevelt High School (Iowa), Des Moines, Iowa
- Theodore Roosevelt High School (Michigan), Wyandotte, Michigan
- Theodore Roosevelt High School (Washington, D.C.)
- Roosevelt High School (Minnesota), Minneapolis, Minnesota
- Roosevelt High School (Missouri), St. Louis, Missouri
- Theodore Roosevelt High School (New York City)
- Theodore Roosevelt High School (Yonkers, New York)
- Roosevelt High School (Dayton, Ohio)
- Theodore Roosevelt High School (Kent, Ohio)
- Roosevelt High School (Oregon), Portland, Oregon
- Roosevelt High School (South Dakota), Sioux Falls, South Dakota
- Theodore Roosevelt High School (San Antonio, Texas), San Antonio, Texas
- Roosevelt High School (Seattle), Seattle, Washington
- Roosevelt High School (Wyoming)

== Other ==
- Roosevelt Hall at Eastern Michigan University, formerly Roosevelt High School
- Roosevelt High School (Roosevelt, New York)
- Roosevelt High School (Lubbock County, Texas)
- Roosevelt Middle School, Oakland, California, formerly Roosevelt High School

== See also ==
- Roosevelt Elementary School (disambiguation)
- Roosevelt Intermediate School
- Roosevelt Junior High School (disambiguation)
- Roosevelt Middle School (disambiguation)
- Roosevelt School (disambiguation)
