= Union Township, Story County, Iowa =

Union Township
- Township
- Location in Story County
- Coordinates: 41°54′24″N 093°31′19″W
- Country: United States
- State: Iowa
- County: Story

Area
  - Total: 36.2 sq mi (94 km^{2})
  - Land: 36.2 sq mi (94 km^{2})
  - Water: 0.0 sq mi (0 km^{2}) 0.0%
- Elevation: 846 ft (258 m)

Population (2000)
  - Total: 1,253
  - Density: 35/sq mi (14/km^{2})
- ZIP Code: 50046
- Area code: 515

Union Township is a township in Story County, Iowa. At the time of the 2000 census, its population was 1,253.

== Geography ==
Union Township covers an area of 36.3 square miles (94 km^{2}) and contains the incorporated town of Cambridge. According to the United States Geological Survey, it contains one cemetery: the Cambridge Cemetery.

Interstate 35 runs north and south through the township. County Road E29 and Iowa Hwy 210 runs east–west.

The Skunk River flows from the northwest to the southeast through the township.

Story County maintains the Askew Bridge/Cambridge Pond recreational site at the intersection of 290th Street and R70. This 13-acre (53,000 m^{2}) borrow pit site contains a 4-acre (16,000 m^{2}) pond surrounded by native vegetation. Along with hunting and fishing, this area provides a Skunk River Water Trail Canoe Access.

The county also maintains the Christiansen Forest Preserve at 55973 310th Street. It is a 45-acre (180,000 m^{2}) wooded tract at the western edge of the township, continuing into Palestine Township. It was donated to the conservation board in 1985 by Charles Christiansen and is designated as a wildlife refuge (no hunting is allowed). The preserve offers hiking, off-road biking, and bluebird trails. Equestrians are not allowed at the preserve. There is a replica of a colonial-times cabin built by Ballard school students.

Union Township is adjacent to Indian Creek, Grant and Palestine townships.
