= Iowa Highway 210 =

State highway in Iowa, United States

Iowa Highway 210
- Iowa 210 highlighted in red

Route information
- Maintained by Iowa DOT
- Length: 34.781 mi (55.975 km)
- Existed: January 8, 1938–present

Major junctions
- South end: Iowa 141 near Woodward
- Iowa 17 overlap in Madrid; US 69 near Huxley; I-35 (Exit 102) near Huxley
- North end: US 65 near Collins

Location
- Country: United States
- State: Iowa
- Counties: Dallas; Boone; Story

Highway system
- Iowa Primary Highway System; Interstate; US; State; Secondary; Scenic
| ← Iowa 202 | → Iowa 212 |

Iowa Highway 210 (Iowa 210) is an east–west highway in central Iowa covering 34.86 miles (56.10 km). It begins at Iowa Highway 141 south of Woodward and ends at U.S. Highway 65 south of Collins. The routing closely parallels and crosses the former Chicago, Milwaukee, St. Paul and Pacific Railroad grade. Passing through mostly rural farmland, Iowa 210 serves as a collector for two central Iowa freeways — Interstate 35 and Iowa 141.

== Route description ==
Iowa Highway 210 begins at an interchange with Iowa Highway 141 south of Woodward. Just north of Woodward, and immediately after crossing into Boone County, Iowa 210 turns east at the entrance to the Woodward Resource Center. The route crosses the meandering Des Moines River next to the former Milwaukee Road high bridge before entering Madrid. At Madrid, Iowa 210 shares one block, 0.078 mi (410 ft; 126 m), with Iowa Highway 17.

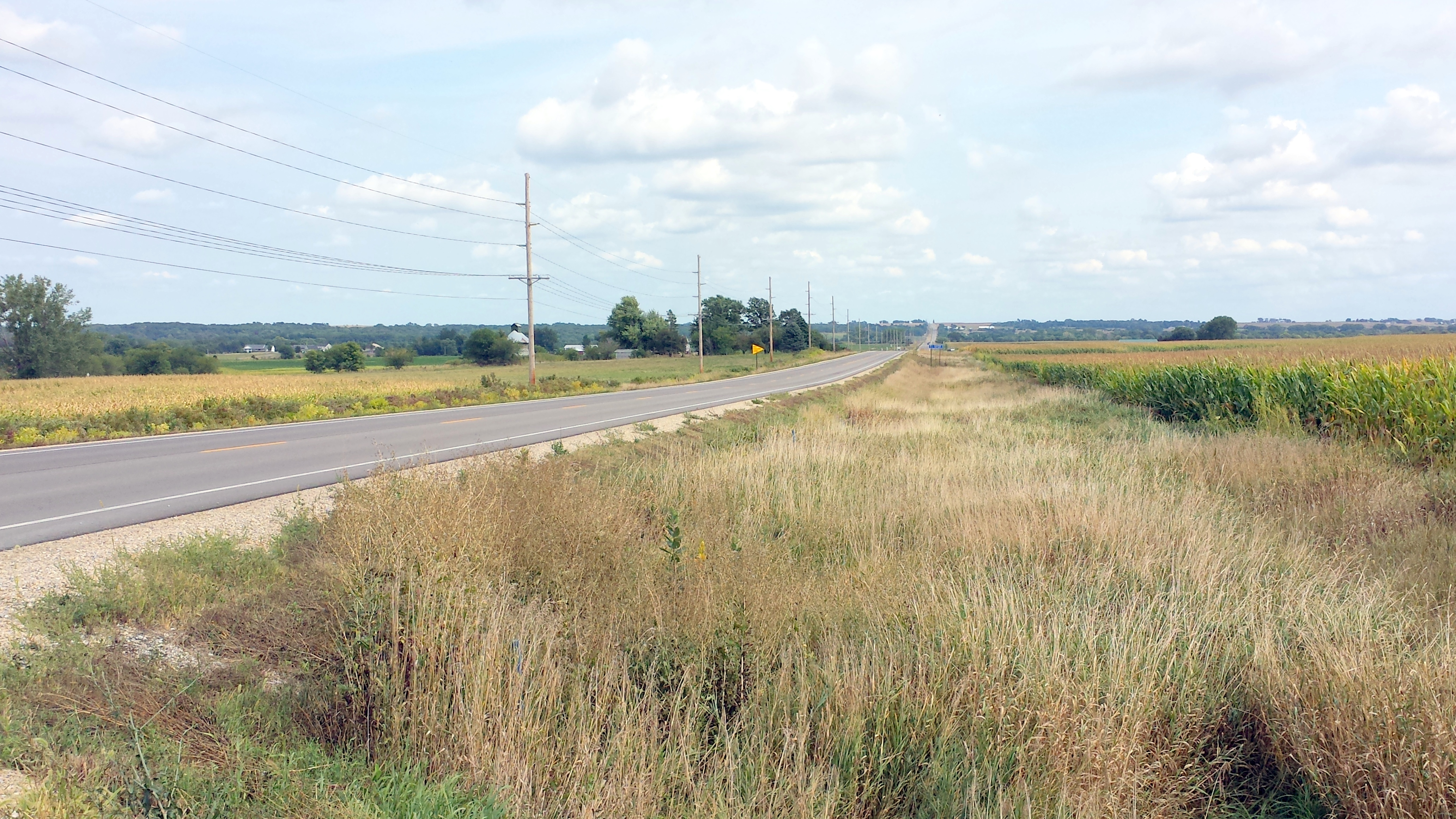
Iowa 210 east of the I-35 interchange

Iowa Highway 210 continues east and enters Story County and the town of Slater. South of Huxley, Iowa 210 intersects U.S. Highway 69. East of US 69, Iowa 210 serves as a collector route to Interstate 35, serving, on average, over 4500 vehicles per day. East of Interstate 35, Iowa Highway 210 primarily serves local traffic. Iowa 210 serves Cambridge via county highways and Maxwell directly. South of Collins, Iowa 210 ends at U.S. Highway 65.

== History ==
Iowa Highway 210 was designated on January 8, 1938, as a double-spur route between Slater and Maxwell. It was extended eastward to US 65 and westward to Iowa 141, absorbing Iowa 89, in November 1980. In 1997, when Iowa 141 was upgraded to an expressway, the southern end of Iowa 210 was extended approximately 500 feet (150 m). A mile marker 1A exists near mile marker 1 to account for the addition.

== Major intersections ==
| County | Location | mi | km | Destinations | Notes |
|---|---|---|---|---|---|
| Dallas | Woodward | 0.000 | 0.000 | Iowa 141 – Perry, Des Moines | |
| Boone | Madrid | 7.837 | 12.612 | Iowa 17 south – Granger | Western end of Iowa 17 overlap |
| Boone | Madrid | 7.915 | 12.738 | Iowa 17 north – Stanhope | Eastern end of Iowa 17 overlap |
| Story | Palestine Township | 19.015 | 30.602 | US 69 – Huxley, Ankeny | |
| Story | Huxley | 20.521 | 33.025 | I-35 (Exit 102) – Des Moines, Minneapolis | |
| Story | Collins Township | 34.781 | 55.975 | US 65 – Bondurant, Des Moines, Iowa Falls | |
1.000 mi = 1.609 km; 1.000 km = 0.621 mi: Concurrency terminus

== Related route ==
Iowa Highway 89
- Location: Woodward to Madrid
- Length: 7.7 mi (12.4 km)
- Existed: 1946–1980

Iowa 89 began at an intersection with Iowa Highway 141 south of Woodward and headed north into the town. Just north of Woodward, and immediately after crossing into Boone County, Iowa 89 turned east at the entrance to the Woodward Resource Center. The route crossed the Des Moines River next to the Milwaukee Road high bridge before entering Madrid. At Madrid, Iowa 89 ended at Iowa 17. Iowa 89 was absorbed into Iowa 210 in 1980.
