= Washington Township, Story County, Iowa =

Washington Township
- Township
- Location in Story County
- Coordinates: 41°59′28″N 093°38′29″W
- Country: United States
- State: Iowa
- County: Story

Area
  - Total: 35.1 sq mi (91 km^{2})
  - Land: 35.1 sq mi (91 km^{2})
  - Water: 0.0 sq mi (0 km^{2}) 0.0%
- Elevation: 971 ft (296 m)

Population (2020)
  - Total: 46,924
  - Density: 1,012/sq mi (391/km^{2})
- ZIP Code: 50010
- Area code: 515

Washington Township is a township in Story County, Iowa, United States. As of the 2020 census, its population was 46,924.

== Geography ==
Washington Township covers an area of 35.1 square miles (91 km^{2}) and contains the incorporated town of Ames, as well as part of Kelley. According to the USGS, it contains five cemeteries: Ontario Cemetery, Ames Municipal Cemetery, Memorial Gardens Cemetery, College Cemetery and Sunday Cemetery.

U.S. Route 69 runs north–south through the township and U.S. Route 30 runs east–west.

Washington Township is adjacent to Franklin, Grant and Palestine townships.

- USGS Geographic Names Information System (GNIS)
