= Warren Township, Story County, Iowa =

Warren Township
- Township
- Location in Story County
- Coordinates: 42°09′55″N 093°23′53″W
- Country: United States
- State: Iowa
- County: Story

Area
  - Total: 35.6 sq mi (92 km^{2})
  - Land: 35.6 sq mi (92 km^{2})
  - Water: 0.0 sq mi (0 km^{2}) 0.0%
- Elevation: 1,086 ft (331 m)

Population (2000)
  - Total: 562
  - Density: 16/sq mi (6.2/km^{2})
- ZIP Code: 50154
- Area code: 515

Warren Township is a township in Story County, Iowa, United States. As of the 2000 census, its population was 562.

== Geography ==
Warren Township covers an area of 35.6 square miles (92 km^{2}) and contains the incorporated town of McCallsburg. According to the USGS, it contains two cemeteries: the Bergen Cemetery and the McCallsburg Cemetery.

County Road S27 runs north and south through the township and County Road E18 runs east–west.

The East Indian Creek flows through the township.

Warren Township is adjacent to Howard, Lincoln and Richland townships.

- USGS Geographic Names Information System (GNIS)
