= Warren Township, Iowa =

Warren Township is the name of several townships in the U.S. state of Iowa:

- Warren Township, Bremer County, Iowa
- Warren Township, Keokuk County, Iowa
- Warren Township, Lucas County, Iowa
- Warren Township, Poweshiek County, Iowa
- Warren Township, Story County, Iowa
- Warren Township, Wayne County, Iowa

== See also ==
- Warren Township (disambiguation)
