= Colo–NESCO Community School District =

Public school district in Colo, Iowa, United States

Coordinates: 41.010192°N 93.318149°W

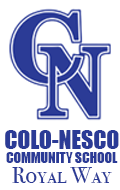

Location
- Colo, Iowa Story, Hardin, and Marshall counties United States
- Coordinates: 42.010192, -93.318149

District information
- Type: Local school district
- Grades: K–12
- Established: 1991
- Superintendent: Mark Snavely
- Schools: 2
- Budget: $8,368,000 (2020-21)
- NCES District ID: 1907920

Students and staff
- Students: 387 (2022-23)
- Teachers: 36.89 FTE
- Staff: 33.32 FTE
- Student–teacher ratio: 10.49
- Athletic conference: Iowa Star Conference
- District mascot: Royals
- Colors: Royal Blue and Silver

Other information
- Website: www.colonesco.org

Colo–NESCO Community School District is a rural public school district headquartered in Colo, Iowa. Its elementary school is in Zearing while the middle-high school and district headquarters are in Colo.

The district is mostly in Story County with portions in Hardin and Marshall counties. The district serves Colo, Zearing, and McCallsburg.

There is an agreement with the Des Moines Area Community College (DMACC) Hunziker Career Center in Ames that allows Colo–NESCO High School students to take vocational courses there.

== History ==
The district was established on July 1, 1987, as a result merger between the Colo and NESCO school districts, with the latter serving McCallsburg and Zearing; "NESCO" means "Northeast Story County".

Nora Gordon of University of California, San Diego, and Brian Knight of Brown University noted in Public Finance Review wrote about the per-pupil revenue changes in Colo–NESCO before and after the merger.

== Schools ==
- Colo–NESCO Elementary
- Colo–NESCO Middle School-High School

== Colo–NESCO High School ==
=== Athletics ===
The Royals compete in the Iowa Star Conference, including the following sports:

- Cross county (boys and girls)
- Volleyball
- Football
- Basketball (boys and girls)
  - Boys' - 1990 Class A state champions
- Wrestling
- Track and field (boys and girls)
- Golf (boys and girls)
- Soccer (boys and girls)
- Baseball
- Softball

== See also ==
- List of school districts in Iowa
- List of high schools in Iowa
