= Palestine Township, Story County, Iowa =

Palestine Township
- Township
- Location in Story County
- Coordinates: 41°54′25″N 093°38′22″W
- Country: United States
- State: Iowa
- County: Story

Area
  - Total: 36.4 sq mi (94 km^{2})
  - Land: 36.4 sq mi (94 km^{2})
  - Water: 0.0 sq mi (0 km^{2}) 0.0%
- Elevation: 1,024 ft (312 m)

Population (2000)
  - Total: 4,604
  - Density: 127/sq mi (49/km^{2})
- ZIP Code: 50124, 50244, 50134, 50226, 50242, 50243, 50046, 50010, 50014
- Area code: 515

Palestine Township is a township in Story County, Iowa, United States. As of the 2000 census, its population was 4,604.

== Geography ==
Palestine Township covers an area of 36.4 square miles (94 km^{2}) and contains the incorporated towns of Huxley, Slater, Sheldahl and Kelley. According to the USGS, it contains six cemeteries: Lincoln Cemetery, Bethany Cemetery, Slater Cemetery, Sheldahl Lutheran Cemetery, Fjeldberg Cemetery and Palestine Cemetery.

== Major highways ==
- U.S. Route 69 (North-South)
- Iowa Highway 210 (East-West)
