= Sheldahl, Iowa =

- City
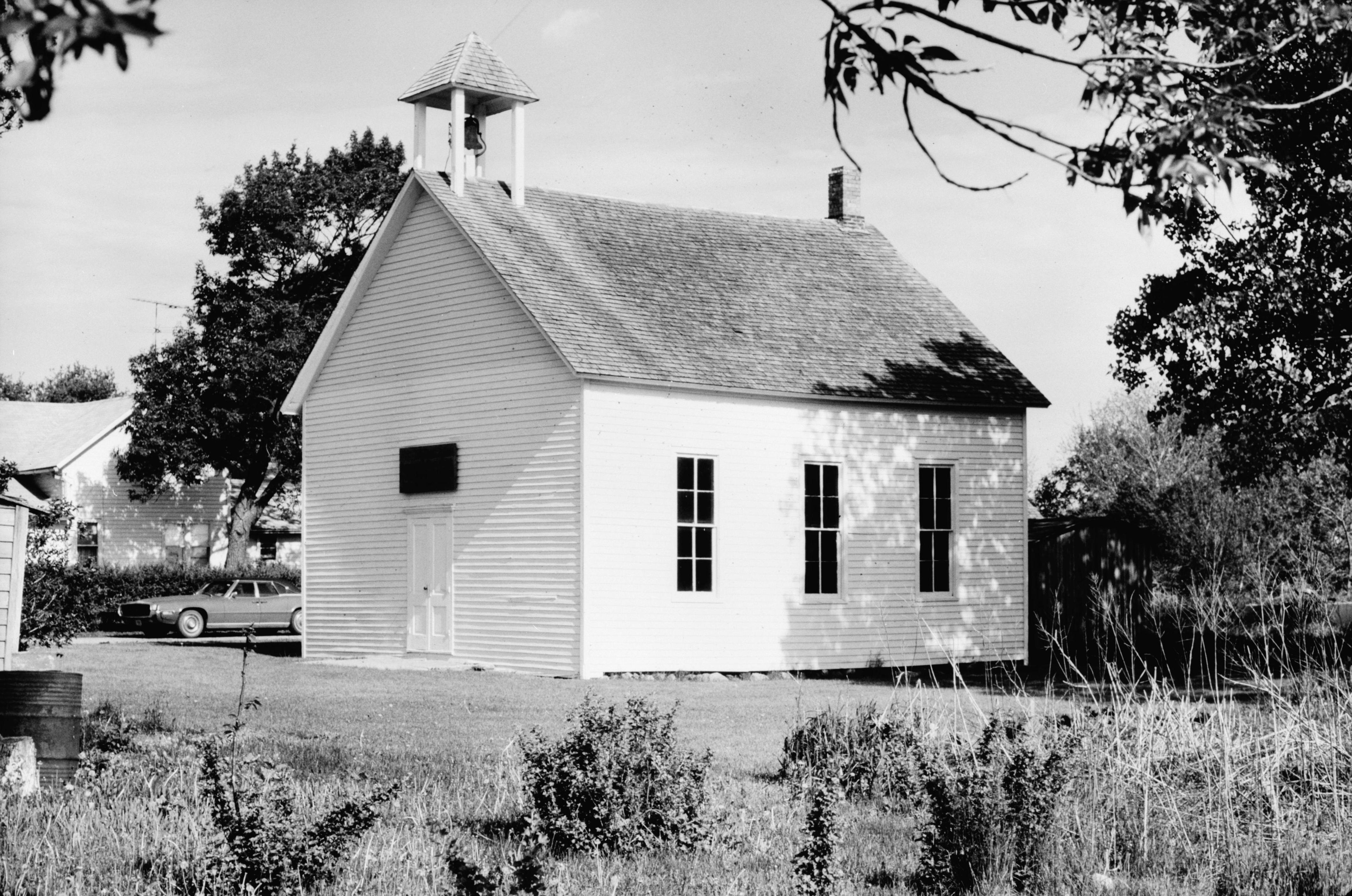
- Sheldahl First Norwegian Evangelical Lutheran Church is listed on the National Register of Historic Places

- Coordinates: 41°51′52″N 93°41′48″W
- Country: United States
- State: Iowa
- Counties: Story, Polk, Boone
- Townships: Garden, Palestine, Lincoln, Union
- Established: June 7, 1855
- Incorporated: January 18, 1882

Area
  - Total: 0.80 sq mi (2.08 km^{2})
  - Land: 0.80 sq mi (2.08 km^{2})
  - Water: 0 sq mi (0.00 km^{2})
- Elevation: 1,030 ft (310 m)

Population (2020)
  - Total: 297
  - Density: 370.2/sq mi (142.93/km^{2})
- Time zone: UTC-6 (Central (CST))
  - Summer (DST): UTC-5 (CDT)
- ZIP code: 50243
- Area code: 515
- FIPS code: 19-72345
- GNIS feature ID: 2395867

Sheldahl is a city in Polk, Boone, and Story counties in the U.S. state of Iowa. The population was 297 at the time of the 2020 census.

The Boone County portion of Sheldahl is part of the Boone Micropolitan Statistical Area, while the Story County portion is part of the Ames Metropolitan Statistical Area. Together, these two areas form the Ames–Boone Combined Statistical Area. The small portion of the city that extends into Polk County is part of the Des Moines–West Des Moines Metropolitan Statistical Area.

== History ==
The area was settled by 120 Norwegian immigrants from Lisbon, Illinois on June 7, 1855; including Osmond and Anna Sheldahl and five of their children. It incorporated as a city on January 18, 1882.

The Chicago and Northwestern Railway established a NE to S rail line through Sheldahl during the 1880s. The Chicago, Milwaukee, St. Paul, and Pacific Railroad connected with this line 2 miles north in Slater. In 2005, Union Pacific Railroad sold a 25-mile discontinued rail corridor—which included the recently abandoned line through Sheldahl—to the Iowa Natural Heritage Foundation, which enabled the construction of the recreational High Trestle Trail. Access to the trail, including a parking area and washroom, is located in Sheldahl.

== Geography ==
According to the United States Census Bureau, the city has a total area of 0.84 square miles (2.18 km^{2}), all land. The town sits on the tripoint of Polk, Boone, and Story counties.

== Demographics ==
Historical populations
Year	Pop.	±%
1900	179	—
1910	202	+12.8%
1920	175	−13.4%
1930	209	+19.4%
1940	206	−1.4%
1950	211	+2.4%
1960	279	+32.2%
1970	285	+2.2%
1980	315	+10.5%
1990	315	+0.0%
2000	336	+6.7%
2010	319	−5.1%
2020	297	−6.9%
Source:"U.S. Census website". United States Census Bureau. and Iowa Data Center; Source: U.S. Decennial Census

=== 2020 census ===
As of the census of 2020, there were 297 people, 125 households, and 97 families residing in the city. The population density was 370.2 inhabitants per square mile (142.9/km^{2}). There were 131 housing units at an average density of 163.3 per square mile (63.0/km^{2}). The racial makeup of the city was 91.2% White, 0.7% Black or African American, 0.3% Native American, 0.7% Asian, 0.0% Pacific Islander, 1.3% from other races and 5.7% from two or more races. Hispanic or Latino persons of any race comprised 1.0% of the population.

Of the 125 households, 31.2% of which had children under the age of 18 living with them, 59.2% were married couples living together, 10.4% were cohabitating couples, 9.6% had a female householder with no spouse or partner present and 20.8% had a male householder with no spouse or partner present. 22.4% of all households were non-families. 13.6% of all households were made up of individuals, 7.2% had someone living alone who was 65 years old or older.

The median age in the city was 43.2 years. 23.9% of the residents were under the age of 20; 5.1% were between the ages of 20 and 24; 21.9% were from 25 and 44; 29.6% were from 45 and 64; and 19.5% were 65 years of age or older. The gender makeup of the city was 53.2% male and 46.8% female.

=== 2010 census ===
As of the census of 2010, there were 319 people, 124 households, and 98 families living in the city. The population density was 379.8 inhabitants per square mile (146.6/km^{2}). There were 132 housing units at an average density of 157.1 per square mile (60.7/km^{2}). The racial makeup of the city was 98.7% White, 0.3% Native American, and 0.9% from two or more races. Hispanic or Latino of any race were 0.9% of the population.

There were 124 households, of which 31.5% had children under the age of 18 living with them, 62.1% were married couples living together, 11.3% had a female householder with no husband present, 5.6% had a male householder with no wife present, and 21.0% were non-families. 16.1% of all households were made up of individuals, and 8.1% had someone living alone who was 65 years of age or older. The average household size was 2.57 and the average family size was 2.84.

The median age in the city was 42.3 years. 25.4% of residents were under the age of 18; 5.7% were between the ages of 18 and 24; 23.3% were from 25 to 44; 29.4% were from 45 to 64; and 16.3% were 65 years of age or older. The gender makeup of the city was 50.8% male and 49.2% female.

=== 2000 census ===
As of the census of 2000, there were 336 people, 129 households, and 99 families living in the city. The population density was 398.5 inhabitants per square mile (153.9/km^{2}). There were 132 housing units at an average density of 156.6 per square mile (60.5/km^{2}). The racial makeup of the city was 99.70% White, 0.30% from other races. Hispanic or Latino of any race were 0.30% of the population.

There were 129 households, out of which 34.1% had children under the age of 18 living with them, 65.9% were married couples living together, 6.2% had a female householder with no husband present, and 22.5% were non-families. 18.6% of all households were made up of individuals, and 9.3% had someone living alone who was 65 years of age or older. The average household size was 2.60 and the average family size was 2.96.

26.2% are under the age of 18, 6.5% from 18 to 24, 28.6% from 25 to 44, 25.6% from 45 to 64, and 13.1% who were 65 years of age or older. The median age was 37 years. For every 100 females, there were 103.6 males. For every 100 females age 18 and over, there were 105.0 males.

The median income for a household in the city was $48,393, and the median income for a family was $48,571. Males had a median income of $32,969 versus $25,000 for females. The per capita income for the city was $17,811. About 5.7% of families and 3.4% of the population were below the poverty line, including 2.0% of those under age 18 and none of those age 65 or over.

== Education ==
The community is within the North Polk Community School District.

== Notable people ==
- Robert J. Hermann - 9th Director of the National Reconnaissance Office
- Richard D. Johnson - 30th Iowa State Auditor (1979-2001), Mayor of Sheldahl (1964-1975), City Clerk of Sheldahl (1959-1963)
