= Sheldahl First Norwegian Evangelical Lutheran Church =

- U.S. National Register of Historic Places
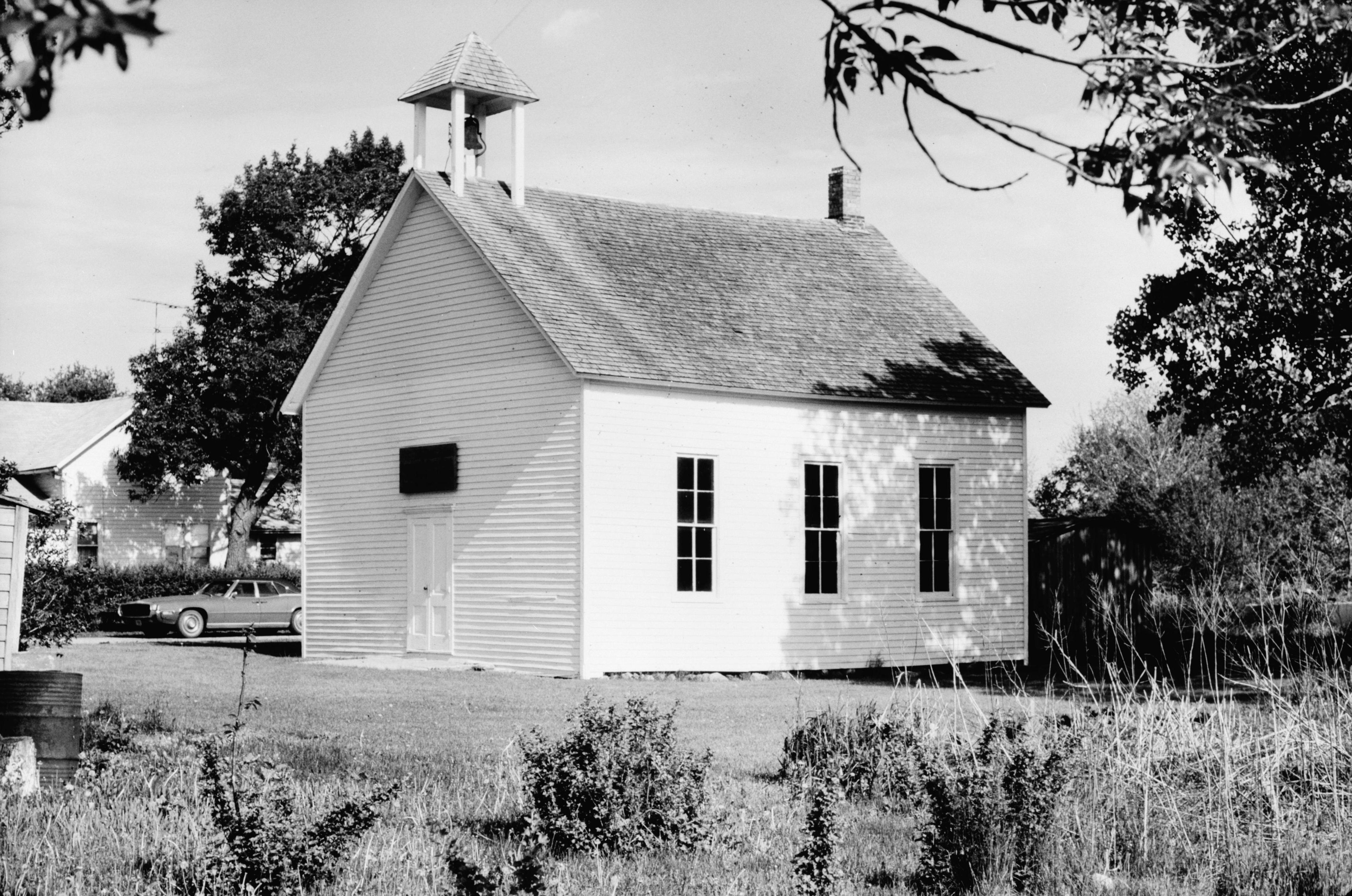

- Location within Iowa Location within the United States
- Location: 3rd and Willow Sts. Sheldahl, Iowa
- Coordinates: 41°51′58.4″N 93°41′42.8″W
- Area: less than one acre
- Built: 1883
- Built by: Osmund Sheldahl
- NRHP reference No.: 84001599
- Added to NRHP: May 11, 1984

Sheldahl First Norwegian Evangelical Lutheran Church is a historic building located in Sheldahl, Iowa, United States. The community was platted by Osmund Sheldahl and J.S. Polk. Sheldahl was a lay Lutheran minister who settled in Illinois in 1845. He and three others came to this area in 1854 in search of cheap available land. The following year, 21 families that had organized themselves as the "Palestine Congregation" relocated to Story County. Sheldahl became a large land owner and the regular pastor for Palestine Lutheran Church in 1860. He built a house in town in 1877 and he and his two sons built this church building in 1883. Osmund Sheldahl served the congregation as an unpaid pastor for 13 years. His will stipulated that the church building be made available to any Christian denomination that emphasized Bible teaching. It remained in regular use until 1936.

The rectangular structure features a balloon frame covered with clapboard and built on a rubble stone foundation. The interior furnishings with decorative cabinet work details were locally made. The building is an unusual example of a private church built on private land, maintained by the founder's family and descendants, and made available for public use. The church building was added to the National Register of Historic Places in 1984. It is noteworthy for its association with the Norwegian settlement of this part of Story County and Osmund Sheldahl's volunteer ministry.
