= Fernald, Iowa =

- Unincorporated community
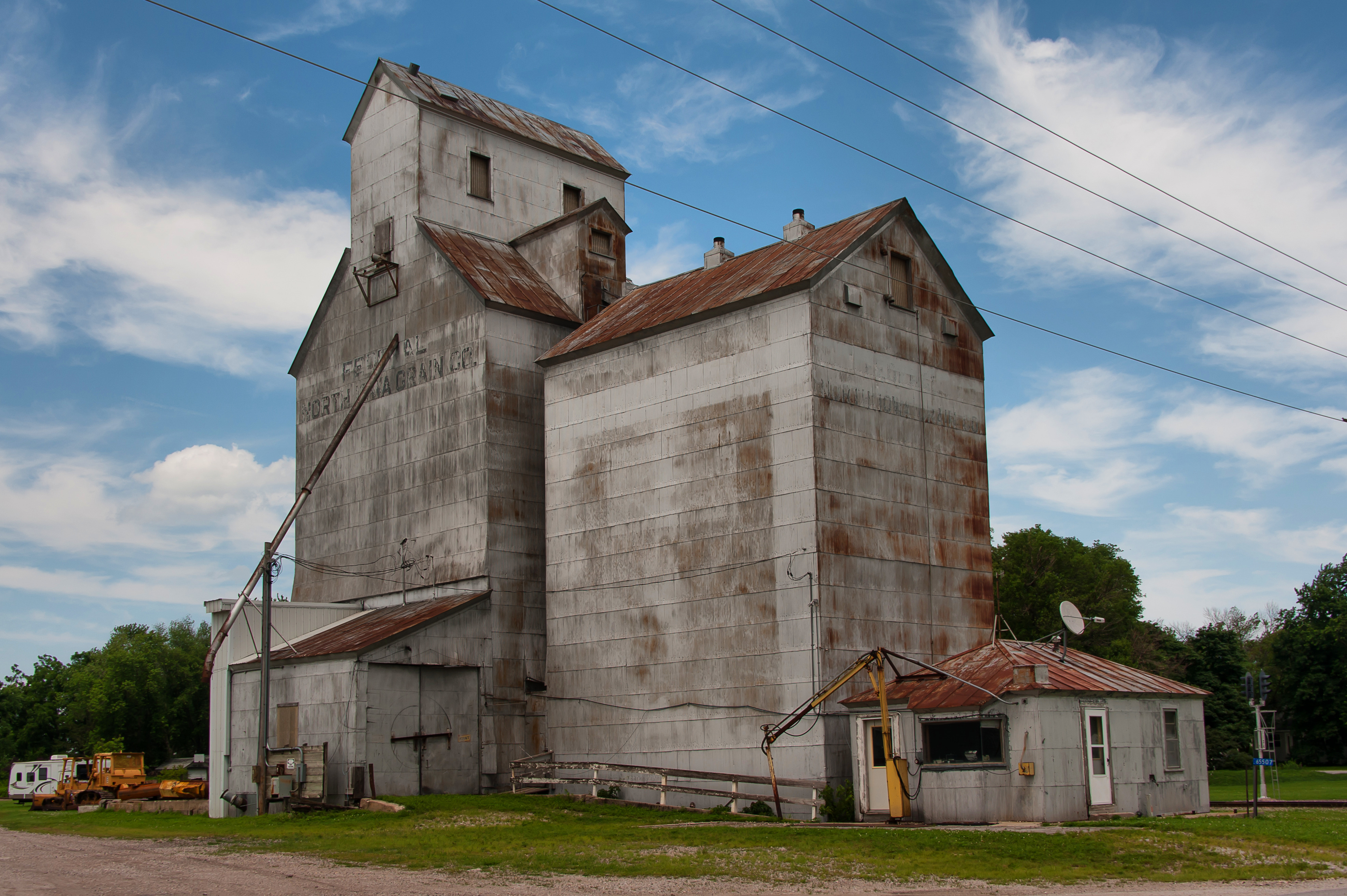
- Abandoned Grain Elevator in Fernald

- Location within Iowa
- Coordinates: 42°04′15″N 93°23′42″W
- Country: United States
- State: Iowa
- County: Story
- Elevation: 1,040 ft (320 m)
- Time zone: UTC-6 (Central (CST))
  - Summer (DST): UTC-5 (CDT)
- Area code: 515
- GNIS feature ID: 456578

Fernald is an unincorporated community in Richland Township, Story County, Iowa, United States. The community is 4.5 miles (7.2 km) northeast of Nevada.

== History ==
The population of Fernald was 110 in 1940.

Fernald is considered the geographical center of Iowa and also believed to be the first consolidated school district in Iowa.
