= Ontario, Iowa =

Coordinates: 42°02′09″N 93°40′54″W

Ontario is a former unincorporated community that is located within the corporate limits of Ames, in Story County, Iowa, United States.

== History ==
The first settlement in the area was New Philadelphia laid out in 1855 on the western edge of Story County just northwest of Iowa State College (now Iowa State University). The Chicago and North Western Railway was built just north of the town and the new railroad town complete with a rail station was established in January 1869. It wasn't long before Ontario, strategically situated by the rail line, swallowed up New Philadelphia. A post office was established New Philadelphia in 1858, and renamed Ontario in 1868; the post office closed in 1951. The community was named after Ontario, Ohio, the native hometown of a first settler, Hiram Scott. Ontario failed to incorporate several times; ultimately, it was annexed by Ames in 1962.
