= Nevada Township, Story County, Iowa =

Nevada Township
- Township
- Location in Story County
- Coordinates: 41°59′31″N 093°24′36″W
- Country: United States
- State: Iowa
- County: Story

Area
  - Total: 34.3 sq mi (89 km^{2})
  - Land: 34.1 sq mi (88 km^{2})
  - Water: 0.2 sq mi (0.52 km^{2}) 0.59%
- Elevation: 978 ft (298 m)

Population (2000)
  - Total: 6,934
  - Density: 202/sq mi (78/km^{2})
- ZIP Code: 50201
- Area code: 515

Nevada Township is a township in Story County, Iowa, USA. As of the 2000 census, its population was 6,934.

== Geography ==
Nevada Township covers an area of 34.3 square miles (89 km^{2}) and contains the incorporated town of Nevada. According to the USGS, it contains three cemeteries: Nevada Cemetery, Mound Cemetery and Pleasant Run Cemetery.

U.S. Route 30 runs east–west through the township, and County Road S27 runs north–south.

Story County maintains Hickory Grove Park, a 445-acre (1.80 km^{2}) multiple-use recreational area located in eastern Nevada Township. The park contains a 98-acre (400,000 m^{2}) lake stocked with largemouth bass, bluegill, crappie, channel catfish, and grass carp.
