= Lincoln Township, Story County, Iowa =

Lincoln Township
- Township
- Location in Story County
- Coordinates: 42°09′55″N 093°17′30″W
- Country: United States
- State: Iowa
- County: Story

Area
  - Total: 35.3 sq mi (91 km^{2})
  - Land: 35.3 sq mi (91 km^{2})
  - Water: 0.0 sq mi (0 km^{2}) 0.0%
- Elevation: 1,066 ft (325 m)

Population (2000)
  - Total: 856
  - Density: 24/sq mi (9.3/km^{2})
- ZIP Code: 50278
- Area code: 641

Lincoln Township is a township in Story County, Iowa, United States. At the 2000 census, its population was 856.

== Geography ==
Lincoln Township covers an area of 35.3 square miles (91 km^{2}) and contains the incorporated town of Zearing. According to the USGS, it contains one cemetery: the Zearing Cemetery.

U.S. Route 65 runs north–south through the township and County Road E18 runs east–west. County Road E18 was formerly Iowa Hwy 221 until it was decommissioned on July 1, 2003, and redesignated as a county road.

Story County maintains Dakins Lake, a 41-acre (170,000 m^{2}) park located just north of Zearing in Lincoln Township. It has a 5-acre (20,000 m^{2}) lake stocked with largemouth bass, bluegill, channel catfish, and crappie. It also has a small restored prairie and wooded areas.
