= Ballard Community School District =

Public school district in Huxley, Iowa, United States

Coordinates: 41.897330°N 93.607067°W

Location
- Huxley, Iowa Story, Boone, and Polk counties United States
- Coordinates: 41.897330, -93.607067

District information
- Type: Local school district
- Grades: K-12
- Superintendent: Dani Trimble
- Schools: 4
- Budget: $28,508,000 (2020-21)
- NCES District ID: 1904200

Students and staff
- Students: 1969 (2022-23)
- Teachers: 127.27 FTE
- Staff: 101.88 FTE
- Student–teacher ratio: 15.47
- Athletic conference: Raccoon River Conference
- District mascot: Bombers
- Colors: Red, Blue and White

Other information
- Website: www.ballard.k12.ia.us

Ballard Community School District is a rural public K-12 school district in Story County, Iowa. It includes areas in Story, Boone, and Polk counties, and the towns of Huxley, Slater, Cambridge and Kelley. The School mascot is The Bomber Plane.

== List of schools ==
- Ballard West Elementary
- Ballard East Elementary
- Ballard Middle
- Ballard High School

== Ballard High School ==
=== Athletics ===
The Bombers compete in the Raccoon River Conference in the following sports:

==== Fall sports ====
- Cross Country (boys and girls)
- Swimming (girls)
- Volleyball (girls)
- Football

==== Winter sports ====
- Basketball (boys and girls)
  - Girls' - 2009 Class 3A State Champions
- Wrestling
  - 2-time Class 2A State Champions (2008, 2009)
- Swimming (boys)

==== Spring sports ====
- Track and Field (boys and girls)
  - Boys' - 1994 Class 2A State Champions
- Golf (boys and girls)
  - Boys' - 6-time Class 3A State Champions (1997, 2001, 2007, 2008, 2009, 2010)
- Tennis (boys and girls)
- Soccer (girls)
- Baseball
- Softball
  - 2012 Class 3A State Champions

== Facts and figures ==
=== Enrollment ===
Year	District-wide	High school (9-12)	Middle school (6-8)	Elementary schools (K-5)
2003-2004	1,408	437	208	763
2002-2003	1,347	441	197	709
2001-2002	1,335	426	186	723
2000-2001	1,342	428	207	707

== See also ==
- List of school districts in Iowa
- List of high schools in Iowa
