= New Albany Township, Story County, Iowa =

New Albany Township
- Township
- Location in Story County
- Coordinates: 41°59′36″N 093°17′23″W
- Country: United States
- State: Iowa
- County: Story

Area
  - Total: 34.6 sq mi (90 km^{2})
  - Land: 34.6 sq mi (90 km^{2})
  - Water: 0.0 sq mi (0 km^{2}) 0.0%
- Elevation: 1,017 ft (310 m)

Population (2000)
  - Total: 1,221
  - Density: 35/sq mi (14/km^{2})
- ZIP Code: 50056
- Area code: 641

New Albany Township is a township in Story County, Iowa, United States. As of the 2000 census, its population was 1,221.

== Geography ==
New Albany Township covers an area of 34.6 square miles (90 km^{2}) and contains the incorporated town of Colo. According to the USGS, it contains two cemeteries: Colo Cemetery and Saint James Cemetery.

U.S. Route 30 runs east–west through the township and U.S. Route 65 runs north–south.
