= Collins Township, Story County, Iowa =

Collins Township
- Township
- Location in Story County
- Coordinates: 41°54′20″N 093°17′05″W
- Country: United States
- State: Iowa
- County: Story

Area
  - Total: 35.8 sq mi (93 km^{2})
  - Land: 35.6 sq mi (92 km^{2})
  - Water: 0.2 sq mi (0.52 km^{2}) 0.55%
- Elevation: 1,030 ft (310 m)

Population (2020)
  - Total: 803
  - Density: 22.2/sq mi (8.6/km^{2})
- ZIP Code: 50055
- Area code: 641

Collins Township is a township in Story County, Iowa, United States. As of the 2020 census, its population was 803.

== Geography ==
Collins Township covers an area of 35.8 square miles (93 km^{2}) and contains the incorporated town of Collins. According to the USGS, it contains two cemeteries: Collins Cemetery and Deeter Cemetery.

U.S. Route 65 runs north and south through the township and Iowa Hwy 210 runs west to Maxwell.
