= Milford Township, Story County, Iowa =

Milford Township
- Township
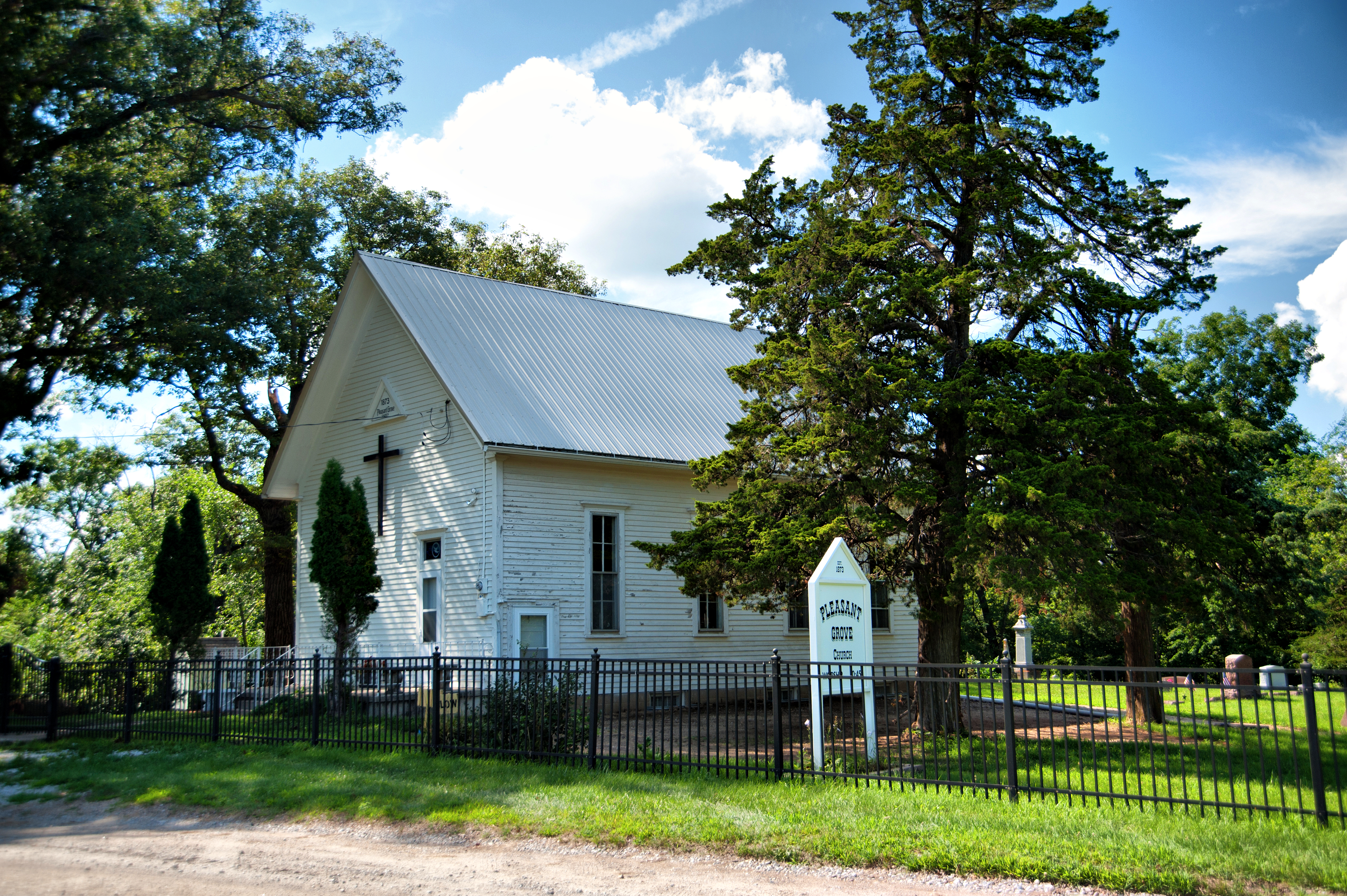
- Pleasant Grove Church and Cemetery

- Location in Story County
- Coordinates: 42°04′39″N 093°31′19″W
- Country: United States
- State: Iowa
- County: Story

Area
  - Total: 37.2 sq mi (96 km^{2})
  - Land: 37.2 sq mi (96 km^{2})
  - Water: 0.0 sq mi (0 km^{2}) 0.0%
- Elevation: 991 ft (302 m)

Population (2000)
  - Total: 569
  - Density: 24/sq mi (9.3/km^{2})
- ZIP Code: 50010
- Area code: 515

Milford Township is a township in Story County, Iowa, United States. As of the 2000 census, its population was 569.

== Geography ==
Milford Township covers an area of 37.2 square miles (96 km^{2}) and contains a small portion of the incorporated town of Ames. According to the USGS, it contains four cemeteries: Brouhard Cemetery, Evergreen Memory Gardens, Knoll Cemetery and Pleasant Grove Cemetery.

Interstate 35 runs north and south through the township and County Road E29 runs east–west.

Story County maintains McFarland Park which is a 200-acre (0.81 km^{2}) area located in northwest Milford Township. Visitors can explore a variety of ecotypes including tallgrass prairie, woodland, and stream habitats. The park has 5.5 miles (8.9 km) of trails that are open to hiking and off-road biking, but interior trails with stairs are closed to bicyclists. The park includes a 6.5-acre (26,000 m^{2}) lake stocked with bluegill, bass, and catfish. Winter activities include ice fishing and cross-country skiing.
