= Collins, Iowa =

- City
- Location of Collins, Iowa
- Coordinates: 41°54′07″N 93°18′30″W
- Country: United States
- State: Iowa
- County: Story

Area
  - Total: 0.49 sq mi (1.28 km^{2})
  - Land: 0.49 sq mi (1.26 km^{2})
  - Water: 0.0039 sq mi (0.01 km^{2})
- Elevation: 1,004 ft (306 m)

Population (2020)
  - Total: 495
  - Density: 1,013.9/sq mi (391.46/km^{2})
- Time zone: UTC-6 (Central (CST))
  - Summer (DST): UTC-5 (CDT)
- ZIP code: 50055
- Area code: 641
- FIPS code: 19-15195
- GNIS feature ID: 2393597
- Website: cityofcollins.municipalimpact.com

Collins is a city in Story County, Iowa, United States. The population was 495 at the 2020 census. It is part of the Ames, Iowa Metropolitan Statistical Area, which is a part of the larger Ames-Boone, Iowa Combined Statistical Area.

== Geography ==
According to the United States Census Bureau, the city has a total area of 0.49 square miles (1.27 km^{2}), all land.

== Demographics ==
Historical populations
Year	Pop.	±%
1900	540	—
1910	521	−3.5%
1920	570	+9.4%
1930	489	−14.2%
1940	516	+5.5%
1950	432	−16.3%
1960	435	+0.7%
1970	404	−7.1%
1980	451	+11.6%
1990	455	+0.9%
2000	499	+9.7%
2010	495	−0.8%
2020	495	+0.0%
Source:"U.S. Census website". United States Census Bureau. and Iowa Data Center; Source: U.S. Decennial Census

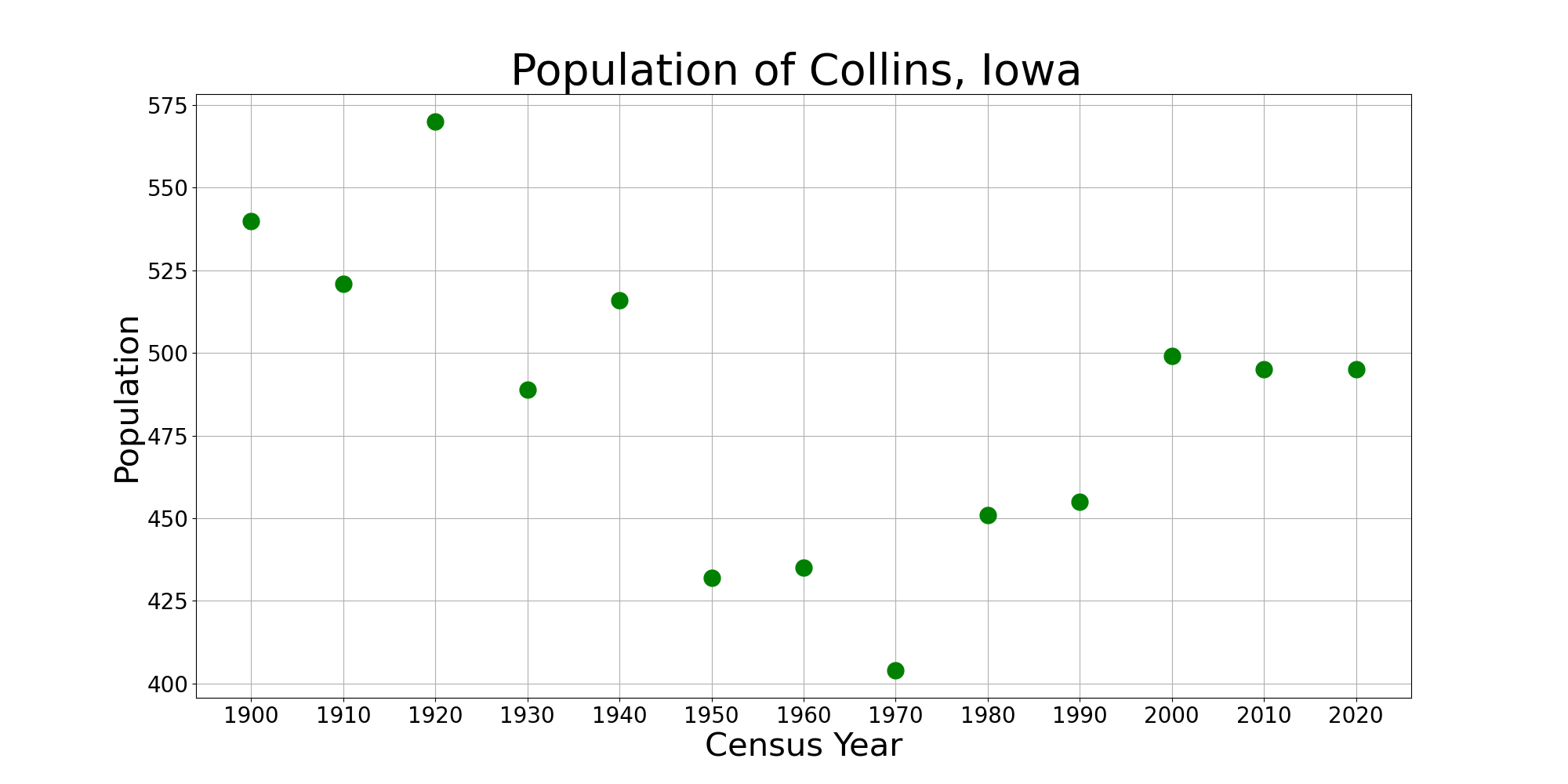
The population of Collins, Iowa from US census data

=== 2020 census ===
As of the census of 2020, there were 495 people, 198 households, and 128 families residing in the city. The population density was 1,013.9 inhabitants per square mile (391.5/km^{2}). There were 220 housing units at an average density of 450.6 per square mile (174.0/km^{2}). The racial makeup of the city was 90.3% White, 0.6% Black or African American, 0.0% Native American, 0.4% Asian, 0.0% Pacific Islander, 0.8% from other races and 7.9% from two or more races. Hispanic or Latino persons of any race comprised 2.2% of the population.

Of the 198 households, 32.8% of which had children under the age of 18 living with them, 41.9% were married couples living together, 11.6% were cohabitating couples, 26.3% had a female householder with no spouse or partner present and 20.2% had a male householder with no spouse or partner present. 35.4% of all households were non-families. 26.3% of all households were made up of individuals, 15.7% had someone living alone who was 65 years old or older.

The median age in the city was 35.6 years. 27.9% of the residents were under the age of 20; 5.9% were between the ages of 20 and 24; 27.9% were from 25 and 44; 22.0% were from 45 and 64; and 16.4% were 65 years of age or older. The gender makeup of the city was 48.9% male and 51.1% female.

=== 2010 census ===
As of the census of 2010, there were 495 people, 196 households, and 133 families living in the city. The population density was 1,010.2 inhabitants per square mile (390.0/km^{2}). There were 219 housing units at an average density of 446.9 per square mile (172.5/km^{2}). The racial makeup of the city was 99.0% White, 0.2% Asian, and 0.8% from two or more races. Hispanic or Latino of any race were 0.2% of the population.

There were 196 households, of which 37.2% had children under the age of 18 living with them, 50.5% were married couples living together, 10.7% had a female householder with no husband present, 6.6% had a male householder with no wife present, and 32.1% were non-families. 31.1% of all households were made up of individuals, and 15.8% had someone living alone who was 65 years of age or older. The average household size was 2.53 and the average family size was 3.11.

The median age in the city was 35.2 years. 31.1% of residents were under the age of 18; 4.9% were between the ages of 18 and 24; 27% were from 25 to 44; 20.8% were from 45 to 64; and 16.4% were 65 years of age or older. The gender makeup of the city was 49.9% male and 50.1% female.

=== 2000 census ===
As of the census of 2000, there were 499 people, 207 households, and 129 families living in the city. The population density was 1,013.9 inhabitants per square mile (391.5/km^{2}). There were 222 housing units at an average density of 451.1 per square mile (174.2/km^{2}). The racial makeup of the city was 99.00% White, 0.20% from other races, and 0.80% from two or more races. Hispanic or Latino of any race were 1.00% of the population.

There were 207 households, out of which 26.1% had children under the age of 18 living with them, 54.1% were married couples living together, 5.8% had a female householder with no husband present, and 37.2% were non-families. 31.9% of all households were made up of individuals, and 18.4% had someone living alone who was 65 years of age or older. The average household size was 2.41 and the average family size was 3.06.

In the city, the population was spread out, with 25.7% under the age of 18, 8.2% from 18 to 24, 26.7% from 25 to 44, 19.8% from 45 to 64, and 19.6% who were 65 years of age or older. The median age was 36 years. For every 100 females, there were 94.2 males. For every 100 females age 18 and over, there were 89.3 males.

The median income for a household in the city was $37,917, and the median income for a family was $42,422. Males had a median income of $29,904 versus $23,229 for females. The per capita income for the city was $20,284. About 3.7% of families and 5.0% of the population were below the poverty line, including none of those under age 18 and 7.7% of those age 65 or over.

== Community ==
Collins has an annual celebration named "Collins' Day" which typically is celebrated with a parade, softball game, and a dance. This celebration is usually held on the last weekend in June.

Iowa Highway 210 starts south of town and runs west to Maxwell and ultimately ends in Woodward.

== Education ==
The Collins–Maxwell Community School District serves the community. The district formed on July 1, 1983, as a merger of the Collins and Maxwell school districts.

Some children in Collins participate in the sports of the Baxter Community School District. Alternatively, some children may go to the nearby towns of Colo or Nevada for school. An elementary school is located in the city.
