= Howard Township, Story County, Iowa =

Howard Township
- Township
- Location in Story County
- Coordinates: 42°09′55″N 093°31′02″W
- Country: United States
- State: Iowa
- County: Story

Area
  - Total: 36.2 sq mi (94 km^{2})
  - Land: 36.2 sq mi (94 km^{2})
  - Water: 0.0 sq mi (0 km^{2}) 0.0%
- Elevation: 1,027 ft (313 m)

Population (2000)
  - Total: 1,945
  - Density: 54/sq mi (21/km^{2})
- ZIP Code: 50248, 50236
- Area code: 515

Howard Township is a township in Story County, Iowa, United States. As of the 2000 census, its population was 1945.

== Geography ==
Howard Township covers an area of 36.2 square miles (94 km^{2}) and contains the incorporated town of Roland and portions of Story City. According to the USGS, it contains four cemeteries: Sheffield Cemetery, Fosen Cemetery, Roland Cemetery and Peerson Cemetery.

Howard Township contains Long Dick Creek.

Interstate 35 runs north and south through the township and County Road E18 runs east–west. County Road E18 was formerly Iowa Hwy 221 until it was decommissioned on July 1, 2003, and redesignated as a county road.
