= Zearing, Iowa =

- City
- Location of Zearing, Iowa
- Coordinates: 42°09′32″N 93°17′50″W
- Country: United States
- State: Iowa
- County: Story

Area
  - Total: 0.75 sq mi (1.94 km^{2})
  - Land: 0.75 sq mi (1.94 km^{2})
  - Water: 0 sq mi (0.00 km^{2})
- Elevation: 1,034 ft (315 m)

Population (2020)
  - Total: 528
  - Density: 705.3/sq mi (272.31/km^{2})
- Time zone: UTC-6 (Central (CST))
  - Summer (DST): UTC-5 (CDT)
- ZIP code: 50278
- Area code: 641
- FIPS code: 19-87555
- GNIS feature ID: 2397397
- Website: www.zearingiowa.com

Zearing is a city in Story County, Iowa, United States. The population was 528 at the time of the 2020 census.

== History ==
Zearing was formed out of Lincoln Township, being founded on October 17, 1881, and incorporated on February 6, 1883. The location was selected as it was a suitable water stop for the railroad at that time. It was named for William Mitchell Zearing, a judge from Chicago who donated a bell to the first church in the community.

== Geography ==
Zearing is located 12.3 mi (19.8 km) northeast of Nevada, the county seat.

According to the United States Census Bureau, the city has a total area of 0.75 square miles (1.94 km^{2}), all land.

=== Climate ===
Climate data for Zearing, Iowa
Month	Jan	Feb	Mar	Apr	May	Jun	Jul	Aug	Sep	Oct	Nov	Dec	Year
Mean daily maximum °F (°C)	28.8 (−1.8)	30.4 (−0.9)	47.8 (8.8)	60.4 (15.8)	69.7 (20.9)	78.1 (25.6)	82.2 (27.9)	84.4 (29.1)	76.1 (24.5)	62.9 (17.2)	49.6 (9.8)	33.8 (1.0)	58.7 (14.8)
Mean daily minimum °F (°C)	8.6 (−13.0)	10.3 (−12.1)	26.7 (−2.9)	35.8 (2.1)	44.8 (7.1)	56.6 (13.7)	60.4 (15.8)	60.3 (15.7)	52.8 (11.6)	37.9 (3.3)	27.5 (−2.5)	14.4 (−9.8)	36.3 (2.4)
Average precipitation inches (mm)	0.8 (20)	0.8 (20)	2.0 (51)	3.1 (79)	4.4 (110)	5.2 (130)	4.5 (110)	4.4 (110)	3.2 (81)	2.3 (58)	2.0 (51)	1.1 (28)	33.8 (860)
Source: Weatherbase

== Demographics ==
Historical populations
Year	Pop.	±%
1890	242	—
1900	388	+60.3%
1910	461	+18.8%
1920	471	+2.2%
1930	475	+0.8%
1940	476	+0.2%
1950	514	+8.0%
1960	528	+2.7%
1970	535	+1.3%
1980	630	+17.8%
1990	614	−2.5%
2000	617	+0.5%
2010	554	−10.2%
2020	528	−4.7%
Source:"U.S. Census website". United States Census Bureau. and Iowa Data Center; Source: U.S. Decennial Census

=== 2020 Census ===
As of the 2020 Census, there was a total population of 528 people. There was a population density of 704 people per square mile, spread over 0.75 miles. Of those 528 people, the median age was 36.9 years, with 19.7% of the town's population under the age of 18, 60.2% between the ages of 18 and 64, and 20.1% of the population over the age of 65. There were a total of 231 households, with an average of 2.81 people per household.

57% of the town's population is male, with 43% of the population female. The racial makeup of the town was 93.75% White, less than 0.5% African American, 4.2% mixed race, and 1.51% Hispanic.

The average income per capita of Zearing was $24,001, which is lower than the state average, and the median household income was $54,861, 90% of the average for the rest of the state. 17% of the town lives under the poverty line, which is far higher than the rest of the state which has an average of 11%.

61% of the population of the town is identified as currently married, with 11.7% of women between the ages of 15 and 50 gave birth during that year, almost double the state average.

92.5% of the Zearing population has received a high school degree, which is the same as the Iowa state average. Although Zearing has a lower-than-average percentage of the population having received college degrees, only 28.4% of the town's population has received a college degree compared to the state average of 30.5%.

6.2% of the town's population were veterans.

=== 2010 Census ===
As of the census of 2010, there were 554 people, 219 households, and 146 families living in the city. The population density was 738.7 inhabitants per square mile (285.2/km^{2}). There were 245 housing units at an average density of 326.7 per square mile (126.1/km^{2}). The racial makeup of the city was 99.6% White, 0.2% African American, and 0.2% from two or more races.

There were 219 households, of which 34.2% had children under the age of 18 living with them, 52.1% were married couples living together, 8.2% had a female householder with no husband present, 6.4% had a male householder with no wife present, and 33.3% were non-families. 31.1% of all households were made up of individuals, and 14.6% had someone living alone who was 65 years of age or older. The average household size was 2.40 and the average family size was 2.98.

The median age in the city was 39 years. 25.8% of residents were under the age of 18; 7% were between the ages of 18 and 24; 24.6% were from 25 to 44; 22.4% were from 45 to 64; and 20.2% were 65 years of age or older. The gender makeup of the city was 50.0% male and 50.0% female.

=== 2000 Census ===
As of the census of 2000, there were 617 people, 229 households, and 158 families living in the city. The population density was 828.4 inhabitants per square mile (319.8/km^{2}). There were 249 housing units at an average density of 334.3 per square mile (129.1/km^{2}). The racial makeup of the city was 97.57% White, 0.16% African American, 0.81% Native American, 0.65% Asian, 0.16% from other races, and 0.65% from two or more races. Hispanic or Latino of any race were 0.65% of the population.

There were 229 households, out of which 35.8% had children under the age of 18 living with them, 59.0% were married couples living together, 6.6% had a female householder with no husband present, and 30.6% were non-families. 28.8% of all households were made up of individuals, and 12.7% had someone living alone who was 65 years of age or older. The average household size was 2.55 and the average family size was 3.13.

26.6% are under the age of 18, 7.9% from 18 to 24, 26.4% from 25 to 44, 19.3% from 45 to 64, and 19.8% who were 65 years of age or older. The median age was 38 years. For every 100 females, there were 86.4 males. For every 100 females age 18 and over, there were 84.9 males.

The median income for a household in the city was $37,614, and the median income for a family was $45,156. Males had a median income of $30,398 versus $21,250 for females. The per capita income for the city was $14,615. None of the families and 3.2% of the population were living below the poverty line, including no under eighteens and 1.6% of those over 64.

== Arts and culture ==
The city celebrates Zearing Days Celebration festival during the last weekend in July. This celebration used to be held to commemorate Labor Day, but had not been put on since the 1980s, that was until 2000 when a group of Zearing residents decided to start the tradition again. Once started back up again, the first celebration – Just Horsin' Around – was titled in honor of the late Dick Sparrow's 40-horse hitch. This celebration was a one-day event in July that has now grown into a three-day event. Zearing has a long history of other horse performers, trainers, and entertainers other than the Sparrow family as well who have been a significant part of the town's culture and history. Individuals such as Verne Matson, Eric Brown, and Dean Johnston all successfully performed and worked with large draft horse teams, and claim Zearing as home.

== Education ==
Zearing is served by the Colo–NESCO Community School District. The district was established on July 1, 1991, by the merger of the Colo and NESCO school districts, with the latter serving McCallsburg and Zearing; NESCO was an acronym for Northeast Story County.

Zearing's facility houses the elementary learning center (grades K-4). The district's central office is based in Colo, as well as the district's high school (grades 5–12).
