= Indian Creek Township, Story County, Iowa =

Indian Creek Township
- Township
- Location in Story County
- Coordinates: 41°54′20″N 093°24′15″W
- Country: United States
- State: Iowa
- County: Story

Area
  - Total: 35.7 sq mi (92 km^{2})
  - Land: 35.7 sq mi (92 km^{2})
  - Water: 0.0 sq mi (0 km^{2}) 0.0%
- Elevation: 866 ft (264 m)

Population (2000)
  - Total: 1,496
  - Density: 42/sq mi (16/km^{2})
- ZIP Code: 50161
- Area code: 515

Indian Creek Township is a township in Story County, Iowa, United States. As of the 2000 census, its population was 1496.

== Geography ==
Indian Creek Township covers an area of 35.7 square miles (92 km^{2}) and contains the incorporated town of Maxwell. According to the USGS, it contains three cemeteries: Woodland Cemetery, Brubaker Cemetery and Peoria Cemetery.

County Road S27 runs north and south through the township and Iowa Hwy 210 runs east–west.
