= Public Finance Review =

- Discipline: Business Economics
- Language: English
- Edited by: Gary Wagner

Publication details
- Former name: Public Finance Quarterly
- History: 1973–present
- Publisher: SAGE Publications
- Frequency: Bi-monthly
- Impact factor: (2010)

Standard abbreviations
- ISO 4: Public Finance Rev.

Indexing
- ISSN: 1091-1421 (print); 1552-7530 (web)
- LCCN: 97657787
- OCLC no.: 38430175

Links
- Journal homepage; Online access; Online archive

Public Finance Review is a peer-reviewed academic journal that publishes papers four times a year in the fields of business and economics. The journal's editor is Gary Wagner (University of Louisiana at Lafayette). It has been in publication since 1973 and is currently published by SAGE Publications.

== Scope ==
Public Finance Review focuses on the variety of allocation, distribution, and stabilization functions within the public sector economy. The journal is a professional forum devoted to economic research, theory, and policy applications. Public Finance Review aims to publish the most up-to-date information to help policy makers, political scientists, and researchers put policies and research into action.

== Abstracting and indexing ==
Public Finance Review is abstracted and indexed in the following databases:

- ABI/INFORM
- Academic Onefile
- Business Source Complete
- Business Source Premier
- EconLit
- General Onefile
- SCOPUS
