= Franklin Township, Story County, Iowa =

Franklin Township
- Township
- Location in Story County
- Coordinates: 42°6′0″N 093°38′0″W
- Country: United States
- State: Iowa
- County: Story

Area
  - Total: 36.7 sq mi (95 km^{2})
  - Land: 36.6 sq mi (95 km^{2})
  - Water: 0.1 sq mi (0.26 km^{2}) 0.27%
- Elevation: 1,000 ft (300 m)

Population (2020)
  - Total: 23,447
  - Density: 519/sq mi (200/km^{2})
- ZIP Code: 50010
- Area code: 515

Franklin Township is a township in Story County, Iowa, Iowa, United States. As of the 2020 census, its population was 23,447.

== Geography ==
Franklin Township covers an area of 36.7 square miles (95 km^{2}) and contains the incorporated town of Gilbert and a portion of Ames, primarily the area north of Bloomington Road. According to the USGS, it contains three cemeteries: Bloomington Cemetery, Born Cemetery, and McMichael Cemetery.
