= McCallsburg, Iowa =

- City
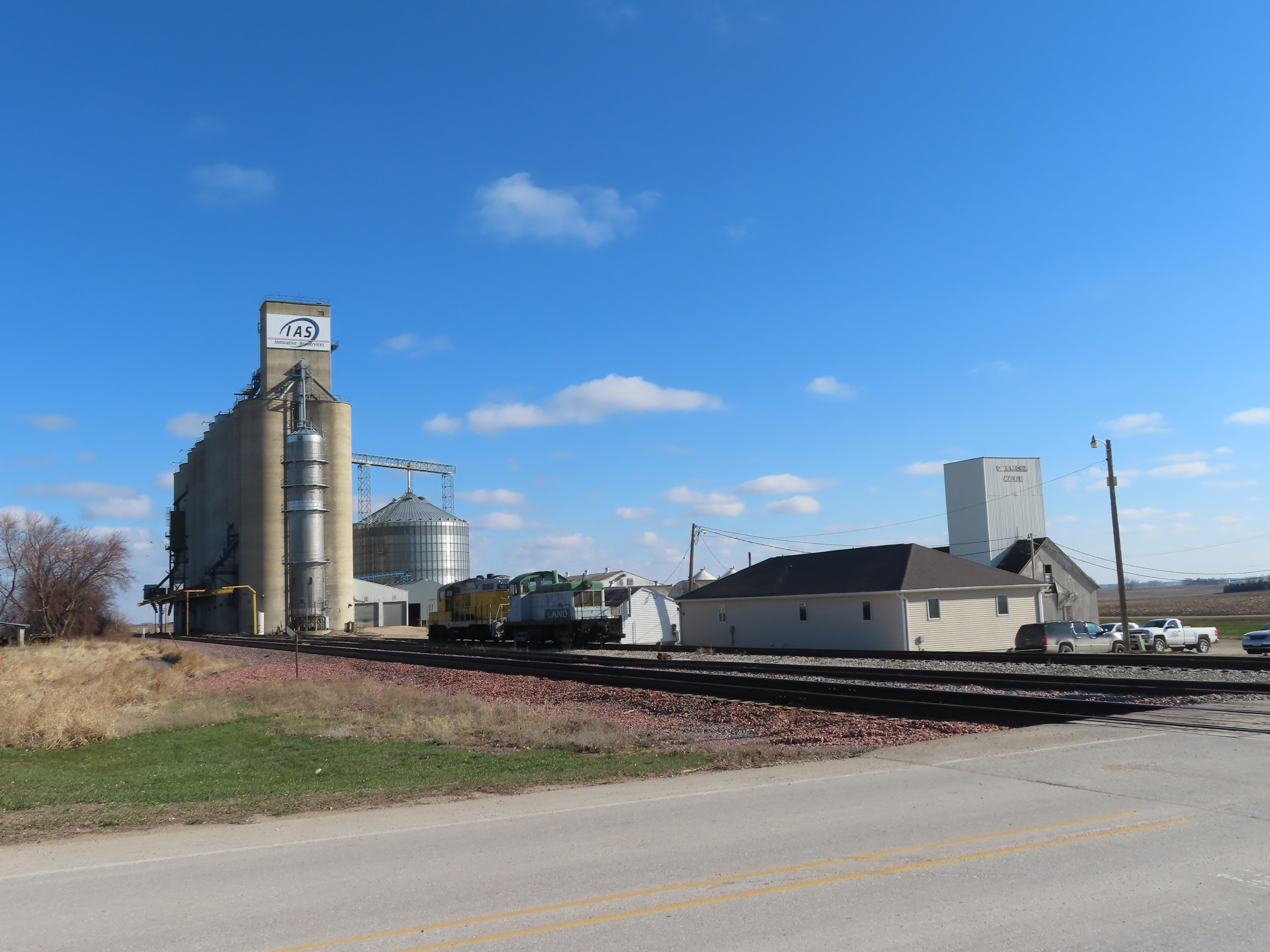
- Railroad crossing in McCallsburg

- Location of McCallsburg, Iowa
- Coordinates: 42°09′54″N 93°23′27″W
- Country: United States
- State: Iowa
- County: Story

Area
  - Total: 0.47 sq mi (1.22 km^{2})
  - Land: 0.47 sq mi (1.22 km^{2})
  - Water: 0 sq mi (0.00 km^{2})
- Elevation: 1,086 ft (331 m)

Population (2020)
  - Total: 353
  - Density: 749/sq mi (289.3/km^{2})
- Time zone: UTC-6 (Central (CST))
  - Summer (DST): UTC-5 (CDT)
- ZIP code: 50154
- Area code: 515
- FIPS code: 19-47775
- GNIS feature ID: 2395058
- Website: www.cityofmccallsburg.com

McCallsburg is a city in Story County, Iowa, United States. The population was 353 at the time of the 2020 census. It is part of the Ames, Iowa Metropolitan Statistical Area, which is a part of the larger Ames-Boone, Iowa Combined Statistical Area.

== Geography ==
According to the United States Census Bureau, the city has a total area of 0.53 square miles (1.37 km^{2}), all land.

== Demographics ==
Historical populations
Year	Pop.	±%
1910	309	—
1920	261	−15.5%
1930	330	+26.4%
1940	278	−15.8%
1950	290	+4.3%
1960	272	−6.2%
1970	307	+12.9%
1980	304	−1.0%
1990	292	−3.9%
2000	318	+8.9%
2010	333	+4.7%
2020	353	+6.0%
Source:"U.S. Census website". United States Census Bureau. and Iowa Data Center; Source: U.S. Decennial Census

=== 2020 census ===
As of the census of 2020, there were 353 people, 132 households, and 90 families residing in the city. The population density was 749.3 inhabitants per square mile (289.3/km^{2}). There were 145 housing units at an average density of 307.8 per square mile (118.8/km^{2}). The racial makeup of the city was 92.9% White, 0.6% Black or African American, 0.3% Native American, 0.0% Asian, 0.0% Pacific Islander, 0.8% from other races and 5.4% from two or more races. Hispanic or Latino persons of any race comprised 2.8% of the population.

Of the 132 households, 42.4% of which had children under the age of 18 living with them, 46.2% were married couples living together, 6.8% were cohabitating couples, 21.2% had a female householder with no spouse or partner present and 25.8% had a male householder with no spouse or partner present. 31.8% of all households were non-families. 22.0% of all households were made up of individuals, 6.1% had someone living alone who was 65 years old or older.

The median age in the city was 31.9 years. 35.1% of the residents were under the age of 20; 4.5% were between the ages of 20 and 24; 28.9% were from 25 and 44; 21.0% were from 45 and 64; and 10.5% were 65 years of age or older. The gender makeup of the city was 53.8% male and 46.2% female.

=== 2010 census ===
As of the census of 2010, there were 333 people, 131 households, and 89 families living in the city. The population density was 628.3 inhabitants per square mile (242.6/km^{2}). There were 148 housing units at an average density of 279.2 per square mile (107.8/km^{2}). The racial makeup of the city was 97.6% White, 0.6% African American, and 1.8% from two or more races. Hispanic or Latino of any race were 1.2% of the population.

There were 131 households, of which 35.1% had children under the age of 18 living with them, 55.7% were married couples living together, 6.1% had a female householder with no husband present, 6.1% had a male householder with no wife present, and 32.1% were non-families. 27.5% of all households were made up of individuals, and 12.2% had someone living alone who was 65 years of age or older. The average household size was 2.54 and the average family size was 3.15.

The median age in the city was 34.9 years. 29.4% of residents were under the age of 18; 5.7% were between the ages of 18 and 24; 29.4% were from 25 to 44; 23.4% were from 45 to 64; and 12% were 65 years of age or older. The gender makeup of the city was 51.4% male and 48.6% female.

=== 2000 census ===
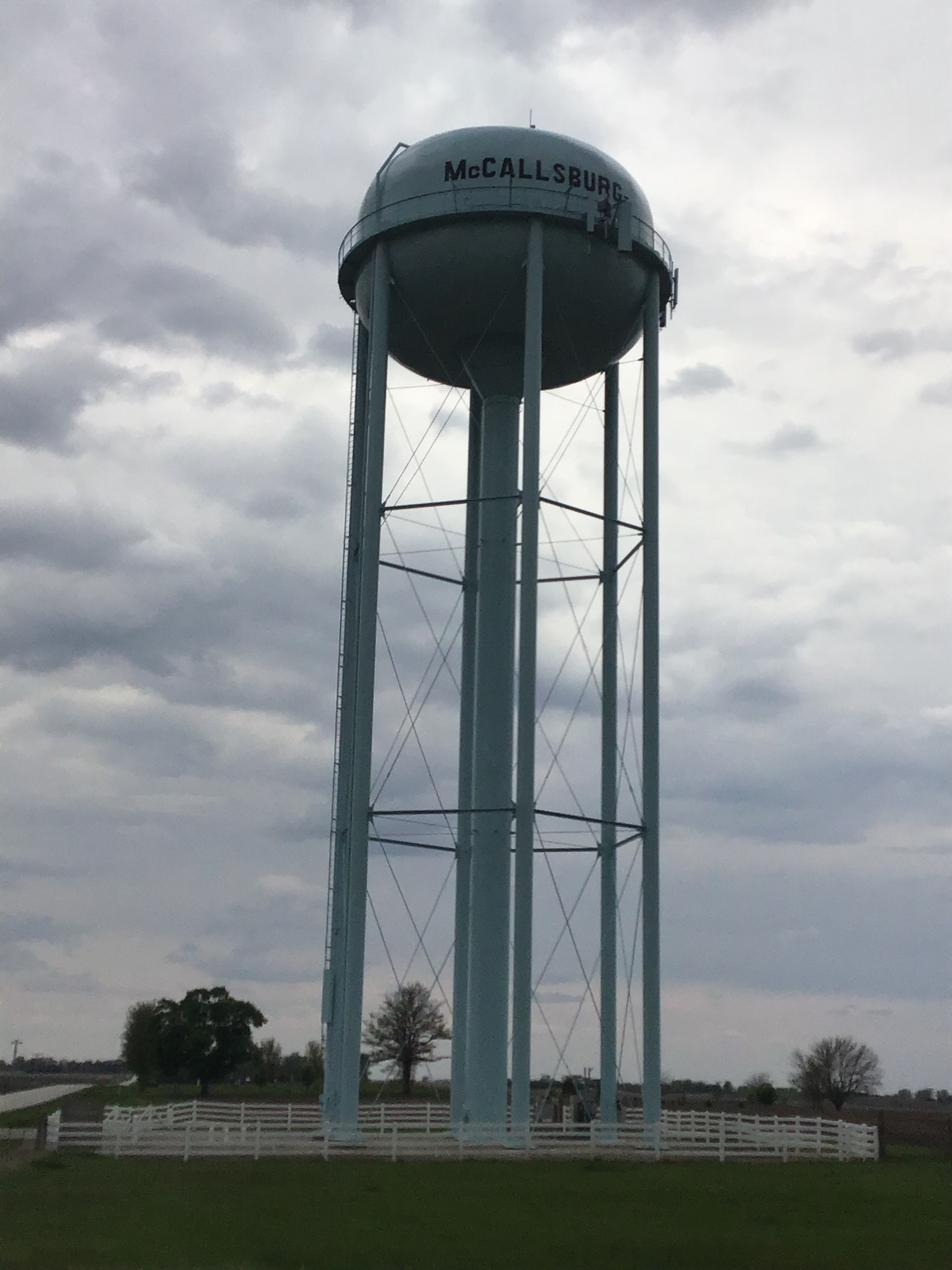
North Side of the McCallsburg Water Tower

As of the census of 2000, there were 318 people, 125 households, and 91 families living in the city. The population density was 600.2 inhabitants per square mile (231.7/km^{2}). There were 137 housing units at an average density of 258.6 per square mile (99.8/km^{2}). The racial makeup of the city was 98.11% White, 1.26% African American, 0.31% Asian, and 0.31% from two or more races.

There were 125 households, out of which 36.8% had children under the age of 18 living with them, 61.6% were married couples living together, 7.2% had a female householder with no husband present, and 26.4% were non-families. 24.0% of all households were made up of individuals, and 12.8% had someone living alone who was 65 years of age or older. The average household size was 2.54 and the average family size was 2.99.

In the city, the population was spread out, with 28.9% under the age of 18, 5.0% from 18 to 24, 24.5% from 25 to 44, 22.3% from 45 to 64, and 19.2% who were 65 years of age or older. The median age was 38 years. For every 100 females, there were 96.3 males. For every 100 females age 18 and over, there were 98.2 males.

The median income for a household in the city was $35,250, and the median income for a family was $44,375. Males had a median income of $33,750 versus $19,875 for females. The per capita income for the city was $16,135. About 6.6% of families and 9.2% of the population were below the poverty line, including 13.6% of those under age 18 and 8.6% of those age 65 or over.

== Education ==
The community is within the Colo–NESCO Community School District. The district was established on July 1, 1991, by the merger of the Colo and NESCO school districts, with the latter serving McCallsburg and Zearing; "NESCO" means "Northeast Story County".

== Notable person ==
- Robert H. Lounsberry, Secretary of Agriculture of Iowa (1973-1987)
