= Cambridge, Iowa =

- City
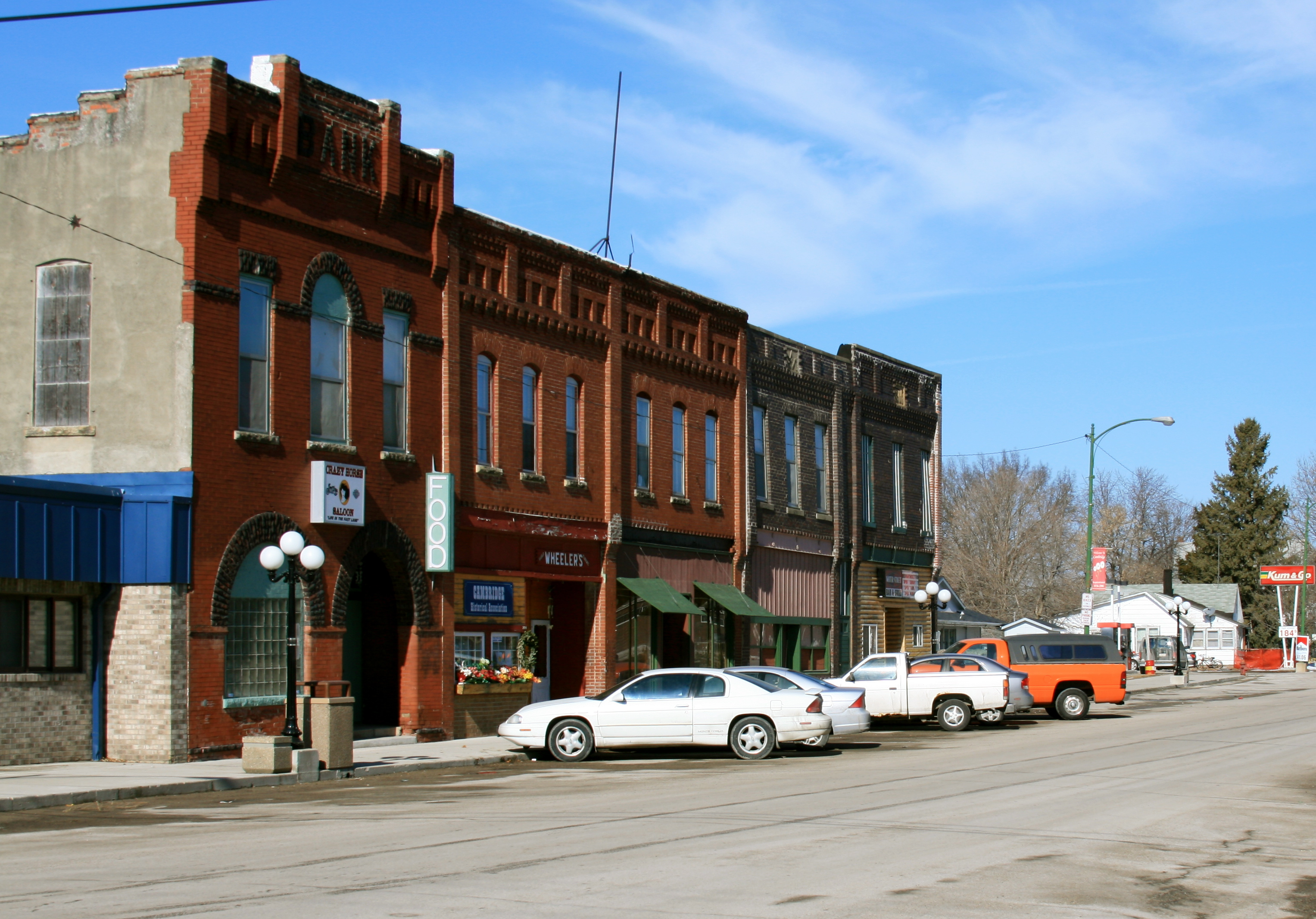
- View along Water Street in Cambridge, Iowa

- Location of Cambridge, Iowa
- Coordinates: 41°54′00″N 93°32′09″W
- Country: United States
- State: Iowa
- County: Story

Area
  - Total: 1.34 sq mi (3.46 km^{2})
  - Land: 1.34 sq mi (3.46 km^{2})
  - Water: 0 sq mi (0.00 km^{2})
- Elevation: 873 ft (266 m)

Population (2020)
  - Total: 827
  - Density: 619.9/sq mi (239.36/km^{2})
- Time zone: UTC-6 (Central (CST))
  - Summer (DST): UTC-5 (CDT)
- ZIP code: 50046
- Area code: 515
- FIPS code: 19-10225
- GNIS feature ID: 2393506
- Website: www.cambridge-ia.us

Cambridge is a city in Story County, Iowa, United States. The population was 827 at the 2020 census. It is part of the Ames, Iowa Metropolitan Statistical Area, which is a part of the larger Ames-Boone, Iowa Combined Statistical Area.

== Geography ==
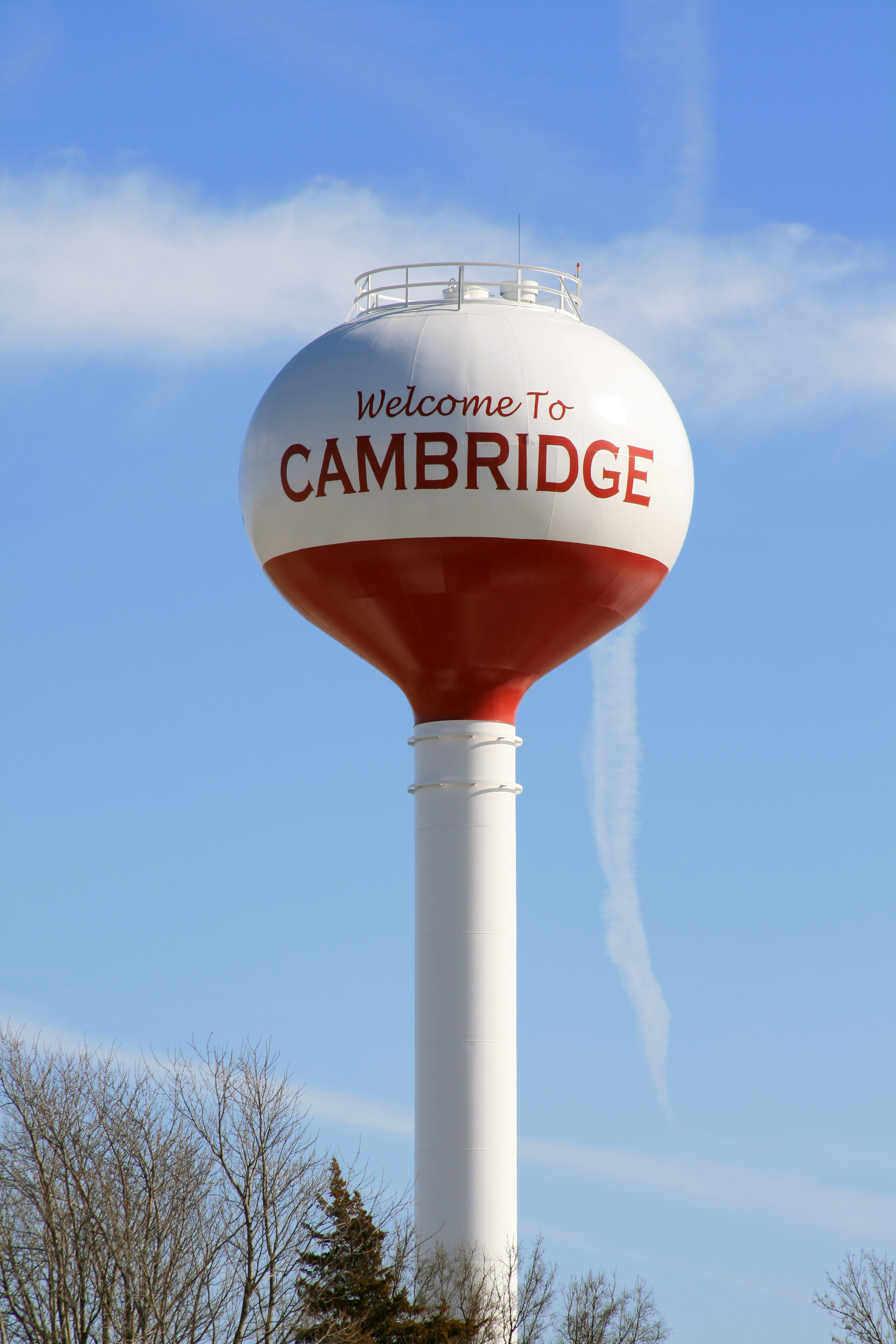
Water tower located in the city

According to the United States Census Bureau, the city has a total area of 1.10 square miles (2.85 km^{2}), all land.

== Demographics ==
Historical populations
Year	Pop.	±%
1870	200	—
1880	223	+11.5%
1890	432	+93.7%
1900	667	+54.4%
1910	696	+4.3%
1920	739	+6.2%
1930	639	−13.5%
1940	608	−4.9%
1950	573	−5.8%
1960	587	+2.4%
1970	661	+12.6%
1980	732	+10.7%
1990	714	−2.5%
2000	819	+14.7%
2010	827	+1.0%
2020	827	+0.0%
Source:"U.S. Census website". United States Census Bureau. and Iowa Data Center; Source: U.S. Decennial Census

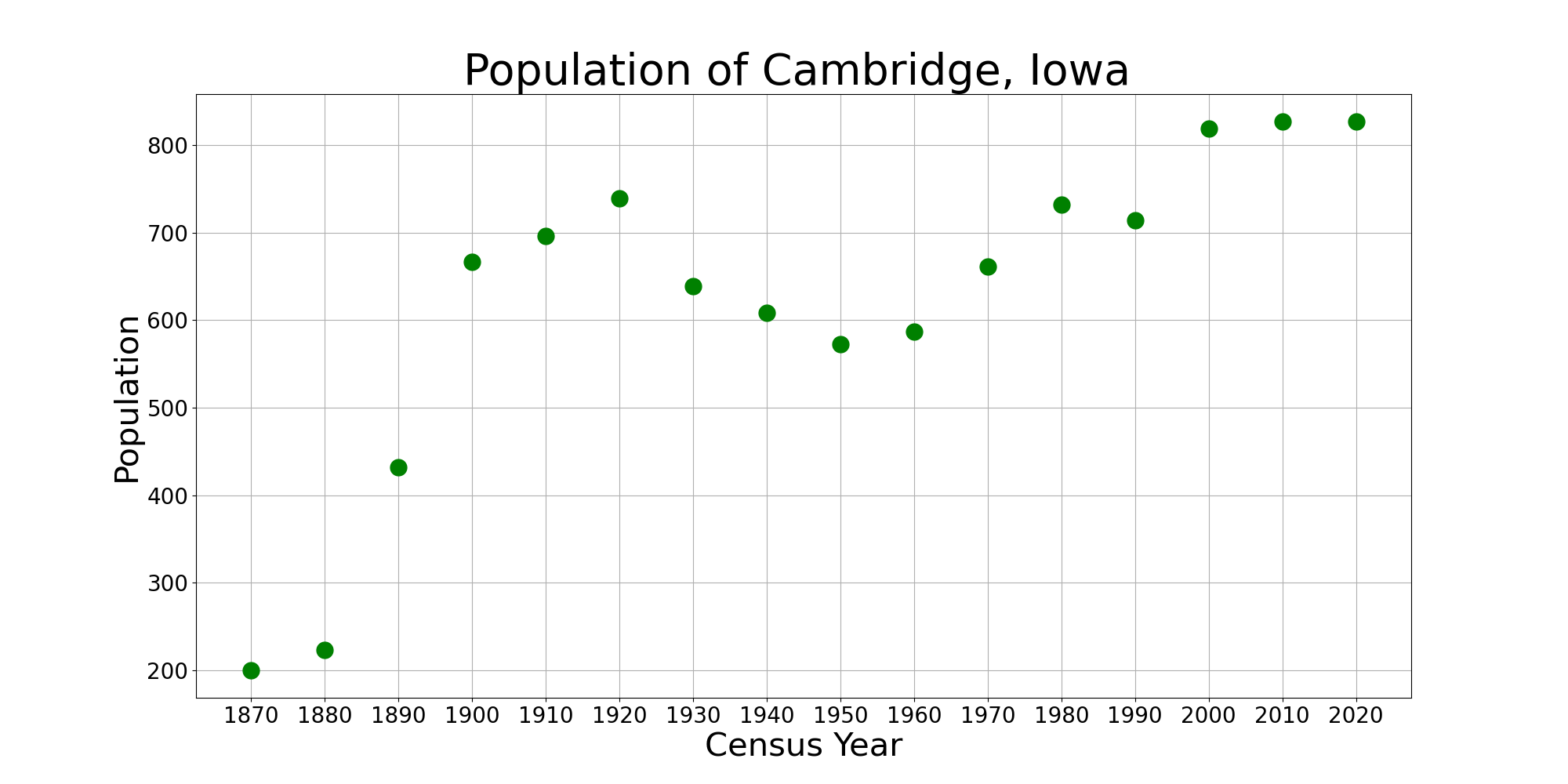
The population of Cambridge, Iowa from US census data

=== 2020 census ===
As of the census of 2020, there were 827 people, 318 households, and 214 families residing in the city. The population density was 619.9 inhabitants per square mile (239.4/km^{2}). There were 337 housing units at an average density of 252.6 per square mile (97.5/km^{2}). The racial makeup of the city was 90.9% White, 1.6% Black or African American, 0.4% Native American, 0.1% Asian, 0.0% Pacific Islander, 1.0% from other races and 6.0% from two or more races. Hispanic or Latino persons of any race comprised 3.7% of the population.

Of the 318 households, 35.5% of which had children under the age of 18 living with them, 52.5% were married couples living together, 8.2% were cohabitating couples, 22.6% had a female householder with no spouse or partner present and 16.7% had a male householder with no spouse or partner present. 32.7% of all households were non-families. 25.5% of all households were made up of individuals, 10.4% had someone living alone who was 65 years old or older.

The median age in the city was 37.2 years. 29.1% of the residents were under the age of 20; 6.7% were between the ages of 20 and 24; 24.1% were from 25 and 44; 27.9% were from 45 and 64; and 12.2% were 65 years of age or older. The gender makeup of the city was 49.5% male and 50.5% female.

=== 2010 census ===
As of the census of 2010, there were 827 people, 310 households, and 221 families residing in the city. The population density was 751.8 inhabitants per square mile (290.3/km^{2}). There were 342 housing units at an average density of 310.9 per square mile (120.0/km^{2}). The racial makeup of the city was 97.1% White, 0.4% African American, 0.5% Native American, 0.6% Asian, 0.4% from other races, and 1.1% from two or more races. Hispanic or Latino of any race were 2.9% of the population.

There were 310 households, of which 36.8% had children under the age of 18 living with them, 61.9% were married couples living together, 6.1% had a female householder with no husband present, 3.2% had a male householder with no wife present, and 28.7% were non-families. 21.6% of all households were made up of individuals, and 10.9% had someone living alone who was 65 years of age or older. The average household size was 2.67 and the average family size was 3.18.

The median age in the city was 34.9 years. 28.5% of residents were under the age of 18; 7.9% were between the ages of 18 and 24; 28.4% were from 25 to 44; 24.1% were from 45 to 64; and 11% were 65 years of age or older. The gender makeup of the city was 48.5% male and 51.5% female.

=== 2000 census ===
As of the census of 2000, there were 819 people, 314 households, and 216 families residing in the city. The population density was 794.5 inhabitants per square mile (306.8/km^{2}). There were 328 housing units at an average density of 318.2 per square mile (122.9/km^{2}). The racial makeup of the city was 95.60% White, 0.73% African American, 0.37% Native American, 0.73% Asian, 0.61% from other races, and 1.95% from two or more races. Hispanic or Latino of any race were 2.81% of the population.

There were 314 households, out of which 36.3% had children under the age of 18 living with them, 57.3% were married couples living together, 8.6% had a female householder with no husband present, and 30.9% were non-families. 22.9% of all households were made up of individuals, and 7.6% had someone living alone who was 65 years of age or older. The average household size was 2.61 and the average family size was 3.11.

In the city, the population was spread out, with 27.8% under the age of 18, 8.1% from 18 to 24, 33.2% from 25 to 44, 21.7% from 45 to 64, and 9.2% who were 65 years of age or older. The median age was 34 years. For every 100 females, there were 95.5 males. For every 100 females age 18 and over, there were 99.7 males.

The median income for a household in the city was $42,059, and the median income for a family was $49,375. Males had a median income of $31,638 versus $25,724 for females. The per capita income for the city was $18,524. About 6.9% of families and 8.6% of the population were below the poverty line, including 11.9% of those under age 18 and 16.3% of those age 65 or over.

== Education ==
Cambridge is served by the Ballard Community School District.
