= Story County, Iowa =

County in Iowa, United States

- County
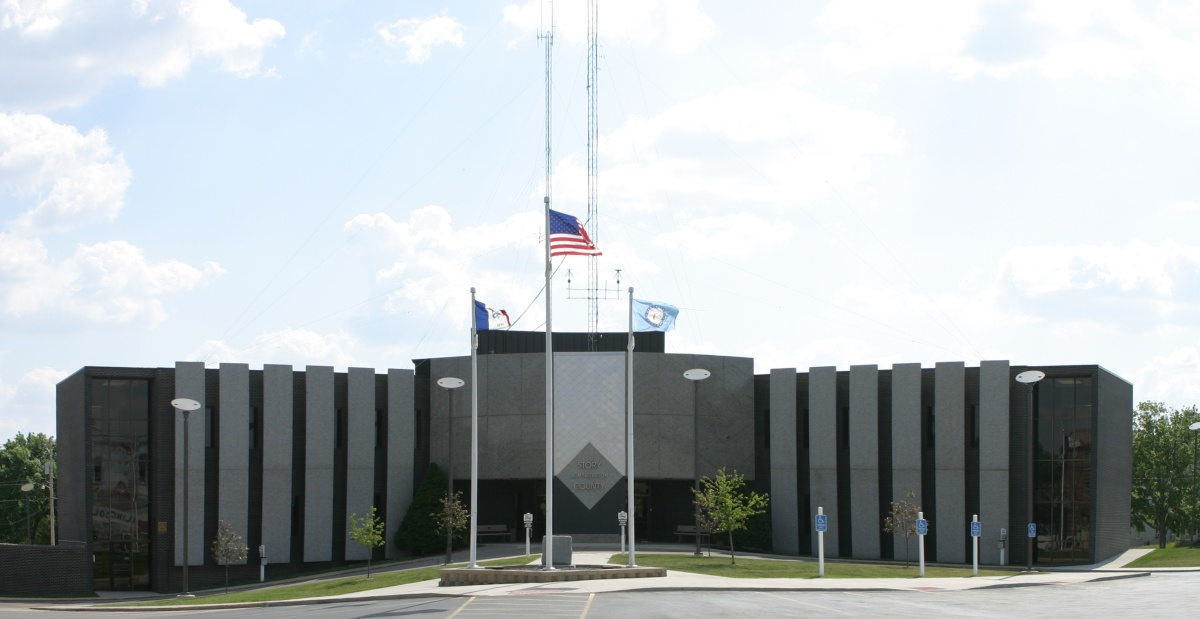
- Story County Administration Building

- Location within the U.S. state of Iowa
- Coordinates: 42°02′16″N 93°27′59″W
- Country: United States
- State: Iowa
- Founded: 1846
- Named for: Joseph Story
- Seat: Nevada
- Largest city: Ames

Area
  - Total: 574 sq mi (1,490 km^{2})
  - Land: 573 sq mi (1,480 km^{2})
  - Water: 0.8 sq mi (2.1 km^{2}) 0.1%

Population (2020)
  - Total: 98,537
  - Estimate (2025): 101,291 ▲
  - Density: 172/sq mi (66.4/km^{2})
- Time zone: UTC−6 (Central)
  - Summer (DST): UTC−5 (CDT)
- Congressional district: 4th
- Website: www.storycountyiowa.gov
- Iowa county number 85

Story County is a county in the U.S. state of Iowa. As of the 2020 census, the population was 98,537, making it the ninth-most populous county in Iowa. The county seat is Nevada and the largest city is Ames. The geographical center of Iowa lies in Story County, 5 miles (8.0 km) northeast of Ames. Story County comprises the Ames, IA Metropolitan Statistical Area, which is included in the Des Moines-Ames-West Des Moines, IA Combined Statistical Area. The county is home to Iowa State University in Ames.

== History ==
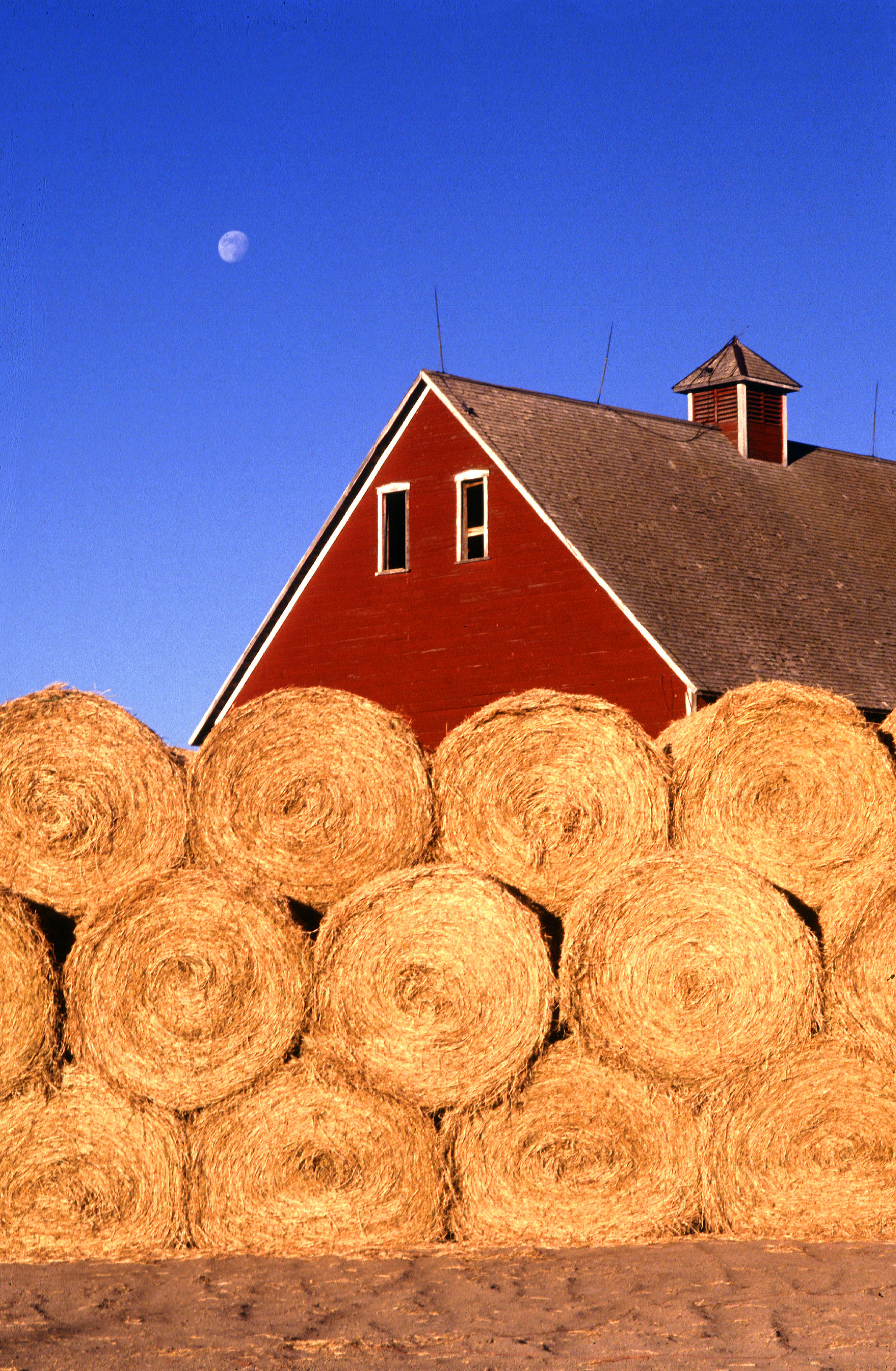
Bales of hay on a farm near Ames, Story County, Iowa

The land that is known as Story County was originally prairie with the exception of some groves along the larger streams in the area. In 1846 the boundaries of Story County were established. The county has an area of 576 square miles (1,490 km^{2}) and is square in shape.

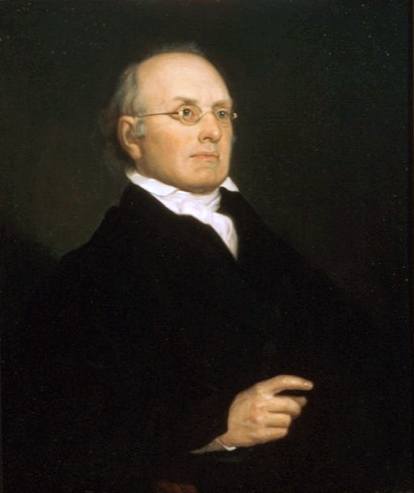
Supreme Court Justice Joseph Story

The county was named after Joseph Story, a preeminent United States Supreme Court Justice, in 1853. The first settlers to the area came from Indiana, then from the New England states of New York and Pennsylvania. Later, many Norwegians, Germans and Danes came directly from overseas and inhabited the area. The first large population influx occurred during the 1850s. Story County was not mentioned in the Federal Census in 1850, but figures from the State of Iowa put the population at 214 in 1852. By 1860 the population had increased to 4,501.

Three commissioners were appointed by the Iowa legislature to determine the county seat location. On June 27, 1853, they announced Nevada as their choice. Nevada (pronounced Nuh-VAY-Dah) was named after the Sierra Nevada mountain range in California. Like many Midwestern towns, cities and counties, many prominent locations from the newly explored West and Mexican–American War of the late 1840s inspired the naming of towns and counties in Iowa during this period.

Railroad construction did more to develop Story County than any other single factor. The first railroad came to the county in 1863 with the first station being built in Colo. Railroads were such a decisive factor in determining the location of towns that several communities in Story County moved to be closer to the rail line. Some flourishing little towns that were bypassed by the railroad soon disappeared. Although Nevada was long the population center of the county, Ames was the most widely known of the towns because of the busy railroad depot where travelers would transfer to their next train.

Story County has had five courthouses. The first, a two-level frame building, was erected in 1856. Fire destroyed it in 1863, and it was replaced by a similar structure, which was replaced by a larger three-level building in 1877, situated on the town square. This building's tower served as a vantage point to view the countryside; it was eventually removed for safety reasons. The fourth courthouse was built in 1967 and placed in service on May 18, 1968. That building is still in use as offices for the Board of Supervisors, Auditor, Treasurer, Recorder, Assessor, Information Technology, Facilities Management, Health and Planning & Development Offices. A cannon from the Civil War rests on the lawn. The current courthouse, the Story County Justice Center, opened in 2002. The Justice Center, comprising the law enforcement and judicial aspects of Story County Government. The Justice Center houses the Sheriff's Office & Jail, Attorney, and Clerk of Court.

Story County consists of 16 townships and 15 incorporated cities, and 4 unincorporated towns. The population of 79,981 in the 2000 census consisted of 71,114 in urban areas and 8867 in rural areas.

== Geography ==
According to the United States Census Bureau, the county has a total area of 574 square miles (1,490 km^{2}), of which 573 square miles (1,480 km^{2}) is land and 0.8 square miles (2.1 km^{2}) (0.1%) is water.

The geographical center of Iowa lies in Story County, 5 miles (8.0 km) northeast of Ames.

=== Adjacent counties ===
- Hamilton County (northwest)
- Hardin County (northeast)
- Marshall County (east)
- Jasper County (southeast)
- Polk County (south)
- Boone County (west)

== Transportation ==
=== Transit ===
- CyRide
- Jefferson Lines

=== Major highways ===
- I-35
- I-35 Business Loop
- US 30
- US 65
- US 69
- Iowa 210
- Iowa 330
- Iowa 930

=== Airports ===
Story County is home to the Ames Municipal Airport, on the south side of Ames. The nearest large airport is the Des Moines International Airport, on the south side of Des Moines, some 30 miles from Story County.

=== Rail lines ===
Story County contains three rail lines, all controlled by the Union Pacific Railroad Company. The Overland Route runs east–west on its route from Chicago to California, passing near Ames, Colo and Nevada in Story County. The Spine Line runs north–south on its route from Minneapolis to Kansas City, Missouri, passing near McCallsburg, Nevada and Cambridge. The third line in Story County begins at Ames and runs near Gilbert and Story City.

== Demographics ==
Historical population
Census	Pop.	Note	%±
1860	4,051		—
1870	11,651		187.6%
1880	16,906		45.1%
1890	18,127		7.2%
1900	23,159		27.8%
1910	24,083		4.0%
1920	26,185		8.7%
1930	31,141		18.9%
1940	33,434		7.4%
1950	44,294		32.5%
1960	49,327		11.4%
1970	62,783		27.3%
1980	72,326		15.2%
1990	74,252		2.7%
2000	79,981		7.7%
2010	89,542		12.0%
2020	98,537		10.0%
2025 (est.)	101,291	▲	2.8%
U.S. Decennial Census; 1790–1960 1900–1990; 1990–2000 2010–2020

=== 2020 census ===
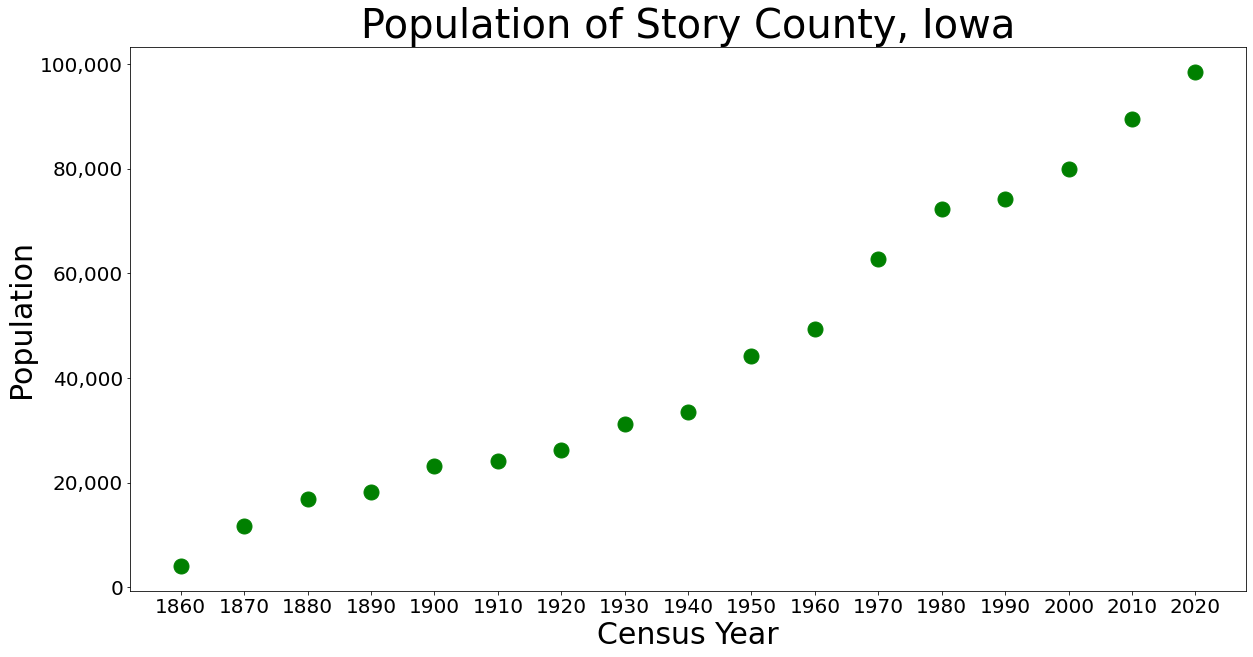
Population of Story County from the U.S. census data

As of the 2020 census, the county had a population of 98,537, with a population density of 171.3/sq mi (66.1/km^{2}). The median age was 26.9 years, 16.8% of residents were under the age of 18, and 13.1% of residents were 65 years of age or older. For every 100 females there were 108.8 males, and for every 100 females age 18 and over there were 109.5 males age 18 and over.

93.90% of the population reported being of one race. The racial makeup of the county was 82.2% White, 3.1% Black or African American, 0.3% American Indian and Alaska Native, 5.5% Asian, <0.1% Native Hawaiian and Pacific Islander, 2.7% from some other race, and 6.1% from two or more races. Hispanic or Latino residents of any race comprised 5.1% of the population.

74.2% of residents lived in urban areas, while 25.8% lived in rural areas.

There were 38,273 households in the county, of which 22.4% had children under the age of 18 living in them. Of all households, 41.0% were married-couple households, 26.4% were households with a male householder and no spouse or partner present, and 26.1% were households with a female householder and no spouse or partner present. About 32.2% of all households were made up of individuals and 9.0% had someone living alone who was 65 years of age or older.

There were 41,361 housing units, of which 7.5% were vacant. Among occupied housing units, 53.2% were owner-occupied and 46.8% were renter-occupied. The homeowner vacancy rate was 1.7% and the rental vacancy rate was 8.1%.

=== Racial and ethnic composition ===
Story County Racial Composition
Race	Number	Percent
White (NH)	79,944	81.13%
Black or African American (NH)	2,980	3.02%
Native American (NH)	226	0.23%
Asian (NH)	5,444	5.52%
Pacific Islander (NH)	29	0.03%
Other/Mixed (NH)	4,882	5%
Hispanic or Latino	5,032	5.11%

=== 2010 census ===
The following Story County statistics were gathered by the 2010 U.S. Census.

Population Story County had a population of 89,542, a 12% increase from the 2000 Census. Of that number, 17.8% of those people are under the age of 18, and 10% are over the age of 65, 95.1% of those people (age 25+) are high school graduates, and 45.4% (age 25+) hold at least a bachelor's degree.

Commuting time Story County workers age 16 and older spent an average of 16.6 minutes traveling to work between 2005 and 2009.

Workforce data There were 45,010 individuals working in Story County and 81.5% of those people live in Story County. The remaining percentages break down as follows: 6.8% live in Boone County (directly west) 4.2% live in Polk County (directly south) 2.1% live in Hamilton County (directly north) 1.2% live in Hardin County (directly north) 1.1% live in Marshal County (directly east).

There were 43,839 working individuals who lived in Story County and worked anywhere, and 83.7% of those people worked in Story County.

Household data According to the 2010 U.S. Census, the median household income in 2009 was $48,165, with an average of 2.41 people per household between 2005 and 2009.

The per capita income in the past 12 months (2009 dollars) between 2005 and 2009 was $24,202.

=== 2000 census ===
As of the 2000 census, there were 79,981 people, 29,383 households, and 17,042 families in the county. The population density was 140 people per square mile (54 people/km^{2}). There were 30,630 housing units at an average density of 54 units per square mile (21 units/km^{2}). The racial makeup of the county was 91.14% White, 1.83% Black or African American, 0.16% Native American, 5.10% Asian, 0.03% Pacific Islander, 0.60% from other races, and 1.14% from two or more races. 1.55% of the population were Hispanic or Latino of any race.

Of the 29,383 households 27.30% had children under the age of 18 living with them, 49.60% were married couples living together, 5.90% had a female householder with no husband present, and 42.00% were non-families. 26.70% of households were one person and 7.60% were one person aged 65 or older. The average household size was 2.39 and the average family size was 2.94.

Age spread: 19.10% under the age of 18, 28.30% from 18 to 24, 25.50% from 25 to 44, 17.30% from 45 to 64, and 9.80% 65 or older. The median age was 26 years. For every 100 females there were 104.60 males. For every 100 females age 18 and over, there were 104.40 males.

The median household income was $40,442 and the median family income was $55,472. Males had a median income of $36,756 versus $26,941 for females. The per capita income for the county was $19,949. About 5.50% of families and 14.10% of the population were below the poverty line, including 6.80% of those under age 18 and 4.30% of those age 65 or over.

=== Story County laborshed ===
Total potential labor force

According to the Story County Laborshed Analysis, which was analyzed and compiled by the Iowa Workforce Development in August 2011, Story County has a total potential labor force of 424,702 people, which breaks down as follows:

- Employed – 75.3%
- Unemployed – 8.37%
- Homemakers – 7.8%
- Retired – 8.2%

Likelihood to accept / change employment The estimated number of individuals who are very likely or somewhat likely to change or accept employment is 106,383, or 25%.

- Employed – 87.6%
- Unemployed – 3%
- Homemakers – 5.2%
- Retired – 4.2%

Unemployment Of those unemployed and willing to enter / re-enter employment:

- Average age – 45
- Male – 50%
- Female – 50%
- Have Education Beyond High School – 67.5%

Wages The estimated wage range to attract the upper 66-75% of qualified hourly wage applicants is $10 to $10.44 per hour, with a median of the lowest wage at $10 per hour.

Commute Those unemployed and willing to enter / re-enter employment are willing to commute an average of 24 miles one way for the right opportunity.

== Law enforcement ==
Story County Sheriff's Office
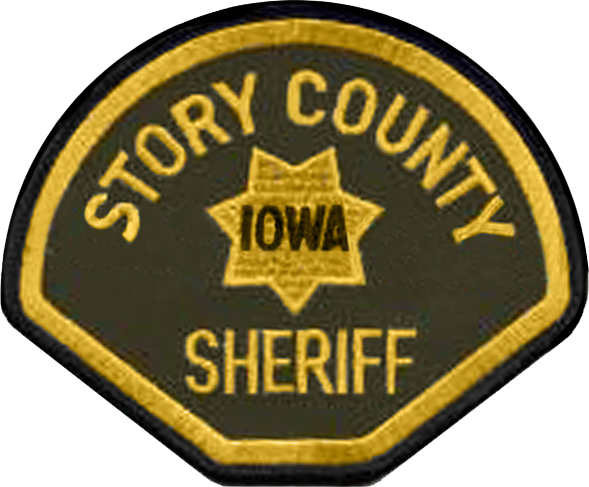

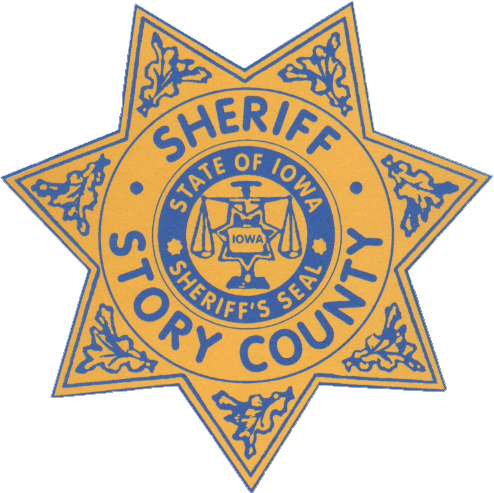
- Abbreviation: SCSO

Jurisdictional structure
- General nature: Local civilian police

Operational structure
- Headquarters: Story County Justice Center; Nevada, Iowa
- Sheriff responsible: Paul H. Fitzgerald

Website
- Story County Sheriff

Primary law enforcement for the county rests with the Story County Sheriff's Office. The department provides law enforcement services for the contract towns and unincorporated areas of Story County, as well as providing for courthouse security, operating the county jail, and performing civil procedures. Paul H. Fitzgerald has served as Sheriff since 1993.

Other law enforcement agencies in the county include:

- Ames Police Department
- Iowa State University Police Division
- Nevada Police Department
- Huxley Police Department
- Story City Police Department

== Communities ==
=== Cities ===
- Ames
- Cambridge
- Collins
- Colo
- Gilbert
- Huxley
- Kelley
- Maxwell
- McCallsburg
- Nevada
- Roland
- Sheldahl
- Slater
- Story City
- Zearing

=== Unincorporated communities ===
- Fernald
- Iowa Center
- Midvale
- Ontario
- Shipley

=== Townships ===
- Collins
- Franklin
- Grant
- Howard
- Indian Creek
- Lafayette
- Lincoln
- Milford
- Nevada
- New Albany
- Palestine
- Richland
- Sherman
- Union
- Warren
- Washington

=== Population ranking ===
The population ranking of the following table is based on the 2020 census of Story County.

† county seat

Rank	City/Town/etc.	Municipal type	Population (2020 Census)	Population (2024 Estimate)
1	Ames	City	66,427	70,457
2	† Nevada	City	6,925	7,217
3	Huxley	City	4,244	4,775
4	Story City	City	3,352	3,374
5	Slater	City	1,543	1,588
6	Roland	City	1,362	1,382
7	Gilbert	City	1,211	1,346
8	Maxwell	City	859	870
9	Colo	City	845	847
10	Cambridge	City	827	840
11	Zearing	City	528	519
12	Collins	City	495	499
13	McCallsburg	City	353	378
14	Kelley	City	304	333
15	Sheldahl (partially in Boone and Polk Counties)	City	297	326

== Politics ==
Prior to 1988, Story County was primarily Republican in presidential elections, only failing to back the Republican Party candidate three times between 1896 and 1984. Since 1988, Story County has voted reliably Democratic, mirroring the trend in counties dominated by college towns (the same is true in Johnson County, home to the University of Iowa in Iowa City). Donald Trump's 2016 election performance in the county was over 3 points worse than Mitt Romney in 2012, despite Trump outperforming Romney statewide by nearly 5 percent and winning Iowa's electoral votes.

United States presidential election results for Story County, Iowa
Year	Republican		Democratic		Third party(ies)	
Year	No.	%	No.	%	No.	%
1896	3,630	68.72%	1,589	30.08%	63	1.19%
1900	4,032	71.91%	1,343	23.95%	232	4.14%
1904	3,919	78.74%	752	15.11%	306	6.15%
1908	3,790	71.05%	1,195	22.40%	349	6.54%
1912	1,247	23.82%	1,224	23.39%	2,763	52.79%
1916	3,722	66.18%	1,772	31.51%	130	2.31%
1920	8,713	80.80%	1,909	17.70%	162	1.50%
1924	6,916	63.06%	1,310	11.94%	2,742	25.00%
1928	9,035	75.72%	2,714	22.75%	183	1.53%
1932	6,735	51.84%	5,638	43.40%	619	4.76%
1936	6,358	46.79%	6,933	51.02%	297	2.19%
1940	7,853	52.11%	7,152	47.46%	65	0.43%
1944	7,163	51.84%	6,554	47.43%	101	0.73%
1948	8,307	54.47%	6,152	40.34%	792	5.19%
1952	13,857	71.81%	5,299	27.46%	140	0.73%
1956	13,264	67.54%	6,352	32.34%	24	0.12%
1960	13,708	65.26%	7,281	34.66%	15	0.07%
1964	8,188	39.73%	12,329	59.82%	93	0.45%
1968	13,327	56.29%	9,456	39.94%	892	3.77%
1972	16,617	53.56%	13,972	45.03%	436	1.41%
1976	18,394	51.85%	15,717	44.30%	1,365	3.85%
1980	15,829	42.36%	13,529	36.20%	8,013	21.44%
1984	19,804	51.56%	18,277	47.58%	329	0.86%
1988	13,782	41.63%	19,051	57.55%	272	0.82%
1992	12,702	34.98%	17,118	47.14%	6,491	17.88%
1996	12,468	38.13%	17,234	52.71%	2,993	9.15%
2000	16,228	45.89%	17,478	49.42%	1,658	4.69%
2004	20,819	46.63%	23,296	52.17%	537	1.20%
2008	18,995	40.78%	26,548	56.99%	1,038	2.23%
2012	19,668	41.71%	26,192	55.55%	1,290	2.74%
2016	19,458	38.40%	25,709	50.74%	5,500	10.86%
2020	20,340	39.85%	29,175	57.16%	1,523	2.98%
2024	21,665	43.74%	26,765	54.04%	1,096	2.21%

== Education ==
School districts in the county include:

- Ames Community School District
- Ballard Community School District
- Collins-Maxwell Community School District
- Colo-Nesco Community School District
- Gilbert Community School District
- Nevada Community School District
- North Polk Community School District
- Roland-Story Community School District
- United Community School District
- West Marshall Community School District

== See also ==
- National Register of Historic Places listings in Story County, Iowa
