= Grant Township, Story County, Iowa =

Grant Township
- Township
- Location in Story County
- Coordinates: 41°59′13″N 093°31′35″W
- Country: United States
- State: Iowa
- County: Story

Area
  - Total: 35.3 sq mi (91 km^{2})
  - Land: 35.3 sq mi (91 km^{2})
  - Water: 0.0 sq mi (0 km^{2}) 0.0%
- Elevation: 971 ft (296 m)

Population (2020)
  - Total: 1,692
  - Density: 30/sq mi (12/km^{2})
- ZIP Code: 50201, 50010
- Area code: 515

Grant Township is a township in Story County, Iowa, United States. As of the 2020 census, its population was 1,692.

== Geography ==
Grant Township covers an area of 35.3 square miles (91 km^{2}) and contains unincorporated village of Shipley and portions of the incorporated towns of Ames and Nevada. According to the USGS, it contains one cemetery: Saint Patrick Catholic Cemetery.

Interstate 35 runs north and south through the township and U.S. Route 30 runs east–west near the northern part of the township.
