= Kelley, Iowa =

- City
- Flag

- Location of Kelley, Iowa
- Coordinates: 41°57′04″N 93°39′56″W
- Country: United States
- State: Iowa
- County: Story

Area
  - Total: 0.69 sq mi (1.80 km^{2})
  - Land: 0.69 sq mi (1.80 km^{2})
  - Water: 0 sq mi (0.00 km^{2})
- Elevation: 1,037 ft (316 m)

Population (2020)
  - Total: 304
  - Density: 437.9/sq mi (169.06/km^{2})
- Time zone: UTC-6 (Central (CST))
  - Summer (DST): UTC-5 (CDT)
- ZIP code: 50134
- Area code: 515
- FIPS code: 19-40395
- GNIS feature ID: 2395501

Kelley is a city in Story County, Iowa, United States. The population was 304 at the time of the 2020 census. It is part of the Ames Metropolitan Statistical Area, which is a part of the larger Des Moines–West Des Moines–Ames Combined Statistical Area.

== History ==
A post office was established at Kelley in 1875, and remained in operation until it was discontinued in 2013. The city was named after George Kelley, one of the town's earliest residents.

== Geography ==
According to the United States Census Bureau, the city has a total area of 0.68 square miles (1.76 km^{2}), all land.

== Demographics ==
Historical populations
Year	Pop.	±%
1900	187	—
1910	231	+23.5%
1920	192	−16.9%
1930	179	−6.8%
1940	159	−11.2%
1950	244	+53.5%
1960	239	−2.0%
1970	235	−1.7%
1980	237	+0.9%
1990	246	+3.8%
2000	300	+22.0%
2010	309	+3.0%
2020	304	−1.6%
Source:"U.S. Census website". United States Census Bureau. and Iowa Data Center; Source: U.S. Decennial Census

=== 2020 census ===
As of the census of 2020, there were 304 people, 122 households, and 84 families residing in the city. The population density was 437.9 inhabitants per square mile (169.1/km^{2}). There were 130 housing units at an average density of 187.2 per square mile (72.3/km^{2}). The racial makeup of the city was 89.8% White, 1.3% Black or African American, 0.0% Native American, 1.3% Asian, 0.3% Pacific Islander, 2.0% from other races and 5.3% from two or more races. Hispanic or Latino persons of any race comprised 4.3% of the population.

Of the 122 households, 32.0% of which had children under the age of 18 living with them, 53.3% were married couples living together, 9.0% were cohabitating couples, 19.7% had a female householder with no spouse or partner present and 18.0% had a male householder with no spouse or partner present. 31.1% of all households were non-families. 24.6% of all households were made up of individuals, 6.6% had someone living alone who was 65 years old or older.

The median age in the city was 34.3 years. 24.3% of the residents were under the age of 20; 7.6% were between the ages of 20 and 24; 32.9% were from 25 and 44; 26.3% were from 45 and 64; and 8.9% were 65 years of age or older. The gender makeup of the city was 52.6% male and 47.4% female.

=== 2010 census ===
As of the census of 2010, there were 309 people, 120 households, and 91 families living in the city. The population density was 454.4 inhabitants per square mile (175.4/km^{2}). There were 127 housing units at an average density of 186.8 per square mile (72.1/km^{2}). The racial makeup of the city was 98.4% White, 0.6% African American, 0.3% Asian, and 0.6% from two or more races. Hispanic or Latino of any race were 1.0% of the population.

There were 120 households, of which 37.5% had children under the age of 18 living with them, 57.5% were married couples living together, 13.3% had a female householder with no husband present, 5.0% had a male householder with no wife present, and 24.2% were non-families. 20.0% of all households were made up of individuals, and 3.3% had someone living alone who was 65 years of age or older. The average household size was 2.58 and the average family size was 2.96.

The median age in the city was 35.1 years. 26.9% of residents were under the age of 18; 9.3% were between the ages of 18 and 24; 26.8% were from 25 to 44; 27.5% were from 45 to 64; and 9.4% were 65 years of age or older. The gender makeup of the city was 50.2% male and 49.8% female.

=== 2000 census ===
As of the census of 2000, there were 300 people, 109 households, and 80 families living in the city. The population density was 1,072.7 inhabitants per square mile (414.2/km^{2}). There were 113 housing units at an average density of 404.1 per square mile (156.0/km^{2}). The racial makeup of the city was 99.00% White, 0.33% Native American, and 0.67% from two or more races.

There were 109 households, out of which 41.3% had children under the age of 18 living with them, 63.3% were married couples living together, 8.3% had a female householder with no husband present, and 25.7% were non-families. 22.0% of all households were made up of individuals, and 6.4% had someone living alone who was 65 years of age or older. The average household size was 2.75 and the average family size was 3.25.

In the city, the population was spread out, with 32.3% under the age of 18, 7.3% from 18 to 24, 38.0% from 25 to 44, 16.7% from 45 to 64, and 5.7% who were 65 years of age or older. The median age was 32 years. For every 100 females, there were 98.7 males. For every 100 females age 18 and over, there were 91.5 males.

The median income for a household in the city was $54,375, and the median income for a family was $57,344. Males had a median income of $31,964 versus $22,000 for females. The per capita income for the city was $17,574. None of the families and 1.0% of the population were living below the poverty line.

== Education ==
The Ballard Community School District operates local area public schools.
