= Richland Township, Story County, Iowa =

Richland Township
- Township
- Location in Story County
- Coordinates: 42°04′55″N 093°24′03″W
- Country: United States
- State: Iowa
- County: Story

Area
  - Total: 36.3 sq mi (94 km^{2})
  - Land: 36.3 sq mi (94 km^{2})
  - Water: 0.0 sq mi (0 km^{2}) 0.0%
- Elevation: 1,027 ft (313 m)

Population (2000)
  - Total: 403
  - Density: 11/sq mi (4.2/km^{2})
- ZIP Code: 50201
- Area code: 515

Richland Township is a township in Story County, Iowa, United States. As of the 2000 census, its population was 403.

== Geography ==
Richland Township covers an area of 36.3 square miles (94 km^{2}) and contains the unincorporated village of Fernald. According to the USGS, it contains one cemetery: the Murphy Cemetery.

County Road S27 runs north and south through the township and County Road E29 runs east–west.
