= Huxley, Iowa =

- City
- Motto: "Heart Of The Prairie"
- Location of Huxley, Iowa
- Coordinates: 41°53′48″N 93°35′31″W
- Country: United States
- State: Iowa
- County: Story

Area
  - Total: 3.28 sq mi (8.49 km^{2})
  - Land: 3.28 sq mi (8.49 km^{2})
  - Water: 0 sq mi (0.00 km^{2})
- Elevation: 988 ft (301 m)

Population (2020)
  - Total: 4,244
  - Density: 1,294.8/sq mi (499.92/km^{2})
- Time zone: UTC-6 (Central (CST))
  - Summer (DST): UTC-5 (CDT)
- ZIP code: 50124
- Area code: 515
- FIPS code: 19-37920
- GNIS feature ID: 2394461
- Website: City of Huxley, Iowa

Huxley is a city in Story County, Iowa, United States. The population was 4,244 at the time of the 2020 census. It is part of the Ames, Iowa Metropolitan Statistical Area, which is a part of the larger Ames-Boone, Iowa Combined Statistical Area.

== History ==
Huxley was incorporated on August 27, 1902. It was named after Thomas Henry Huxley, a British biologist. It is known for its city wide kickball tournament on July 10 every year.

== Geography ==
According to the United States Census Bureau, the city has a total area of 3.15 square miles (8.16 km^{2}), all land.

== Demographics ==
Historical populations
| Year | Pop. | ±% |
|---|---|---|
| 1910 | 336 | — |
| 1920 | 366 | +8.9% |
| 1930 | 362 | −1.1% |
| 1940 | 392 | +8.3% |
| 1950 | 422 | +7.7% |
| 1960 | 486 | +15.2% |
| 1970 | 937 | +92.8% |
| 1980 | 1,884 | +101.1% |
| 1990 | 2,047 | +8.7% |
| 2000 | 2,316 | +13.1% |
| 2010 | 3,317 | +43.2% |
| 2020 | 4,244 | +27.9% |
Source:"U.S. Census website". United States Census Bureau. and Iowa Data Center; Source: U.S. Decennial Census

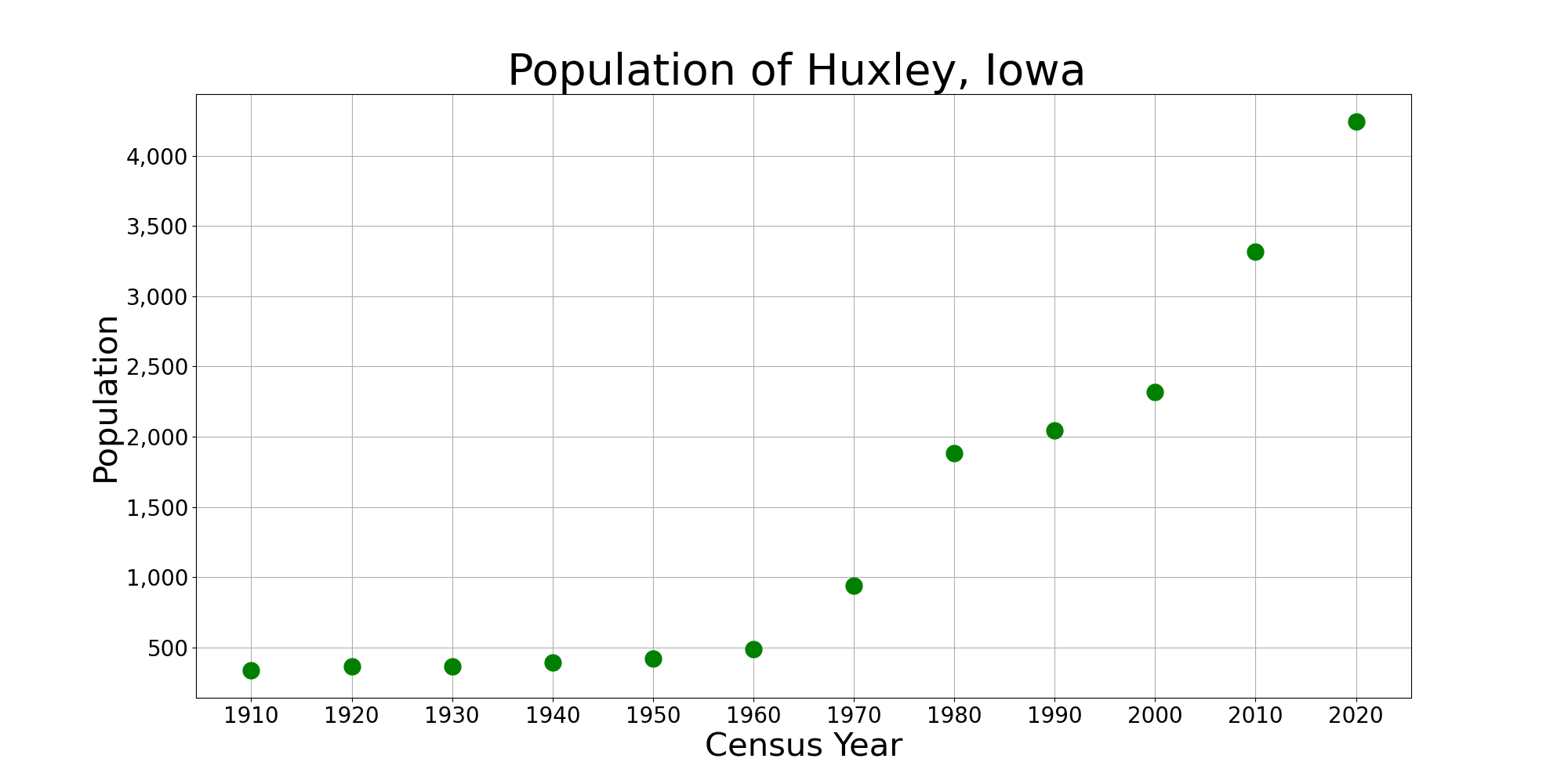
The population of Huxley, Iowa from US census data

=== 2020 census ===
As of the 2020 census, Huxley had a population of 4,244, with 1,513 households and 1,113 families residing in the city. The population density was 1,293.1 inhabitants per square mile (499.3/km^{2}). The median age was 32.9 years. 31.0% of residents were under the age of 18, and for every 100 females, there were 100.0 males, with 96.3 males age 18 and over for every 100 females age 18 and over.

33.6% of residents were under the age of 20; 5.9% were between the ages of 20 and 24; 28.4% were from 25 to 44; 21.4% were from 45 to 64; and 10.7% were 65 years of age or older.

Of the 1,513 households, 42.8% had children under the age of 18 living with them, 62.8% were married-couple households, 6.7% were cohabitating couples, 17.7% had a female householder with no spouse or partner present, and 12.8% had a male householder with no spouse or partner present. Non-family households made up 26.4% of all households. Of all households, 19.0% were made up of individuals and 6.3% had someone living alone who was 65 years of age or older.

There were 1,599 housing units, with an average density of 487.2 per square mile (188.1/km^{2}). Of those housing units, 5.4% were vacant. The homeowner vacancy rate was 1.4% and the rental vacancy rate was 8.7%.

0.0% of residents lived in urban areas, while 100.0% lived in rural areas.

Racial composition as of the 2020 census
| Race | Number | Percent |
|---|---|---|
| White | 3,952 | 93.1% |
| Black or African American | 51 | 1.2% |
| American Indian and Alaska Native | 19 | 0.4% |
| Asian | 23 | 0.5% |
| Native Hawaiian and Other Pacific Islander | 0 | 0.0% |
| Some other race | 35 | 0.8% |
| Two or more races | 164 | 3.9% |
| Hispanic or Latino (of any race) | 107 | 2.5% |

=== 2010 census ===
As of the census of 2010, there were 3,317 people, 1,194 households, and 884 families living in the city. The population density was 1,053.0 inhabitants per square mile (406.6/km^{2}). There were 1,322 housing units at an average density of 419.7 per square mile (162.0/km^{2}). The racial makeup of the city was 95.6% White, 1.0% African American, 0.2% Native American, 0.5% Asian, 1.1% from other races, and 1.7% from two or more races. Hispanic or Latino of any race were 2.2% of the population.

There were 1,194 households, of which 45.0% had children under the age of 18 living with them, 60.2% were married couples living together, 9.6% had a female householder with no husband present, 4.2% had a male householder with no wife present, and 26.0% were non-families. 20.7% of all households were made up of individuals, and 7.7% had someone living alone who was 65 years of age or older. The average household size was 2.78 and the average family size was 3.25.

The median age in the city was 31.2 years. 34.1% of residents were under the age of 18; 7.2% were between the ages of 18 and 24; 29.4% were from 25 to 44; 20.4% were from 45 to 64; and 9% were 65 years of age or older. The gender makeup of the city was 48.6% male and 51.4% female.

=== 2000 census ===
As of the census of 2000, there were 2,316 people, 917 households, and 631 families living in the city. The population density was 2,042.9 inhabitants per square mile (788.8/km^{2}). There were 964 housing units at an average density of 850.3 per square mile (328.3/km^{2}). The racial makeup of the city was 97.41% White, 0.22% African American, 0.30% Native American, 0.56% Asian, 0.65% from other races, and 0.86% from two or more races. Hispanic or Latino of any race were 1.30% of the population.

There were 917 households, out of which 36.8% had children under the age of 18 living with them, 55.1% were married couples living together, 9.3% had a female householder with no husband present, and 31.1% were non-families. 23.8% of all households were made up of individuals, and 8.0% had someone living alone who was 65 years of age or older. The average household size was 2.50 and the average family size was 3.00.

27.2% are under the age of 18, 12.1% from 18 to 24, 30.4% from 25 to 44, 21.7% from 45 to 64, and 8.6% who were 65 years of age or older. The median age was 32 years. For every 100 females, there were 93.8 males. For every 100 females age 18 and over, there were 93.0 males.

The median income for a household in the city was $48,068, and the median income for a family was $56,202. Males had a median income of $37,736 versus $29,013 for females. The per capita income for the city was $20,172. About 3.5% of families and 6.8% of the population were below the poverty line, including 5.3% of those under age 18 and 3.9% of those age 65 or over.

== Arts and culture ==
Huxley hosts the annual Prairie Festival.

== Education ==
Huxley is part of the Ballard Community School District.

== Cultural references ==
Huxley is the home town of the fictional Riley Finn in the television series Buffy the Vampire Slayer.
