= Slater, Iowa =

- City
- Location of Slater, Iowa
- Coordinates: 41°52′36″N 93°41′22″W
- Country: United States
- State: Iowa
- County: Story

Area
  - Total: 1.91 sq mi (4.95 km^{2})
  - Land: 1.91 sq mi (4.95 km^{2})
  - Water: 0 sq mi (0.00 km^{2})
- Elevation: 1,034 ft (315 m)

Population (2020)
  - Total: 1,543
  - Density: 806.9/sq mi (311.55/km^{2})
- Time zone: UTC-6 (Central (CST))
  - Summer (DST): UTC-5 (CDT)
- ZIP code: 50244
- Area code: 515
- FIPS code: 19-73515
- GNIS feature ID: 2395895
- Website: slateriowa.org

Slater is a city in Story County, Iowa, United States. The population was 1,543 at the time of the 2020 census.

== History ==
There has been a post office in Slater since 1887. The city was named for Michael Slater, the original owner of the town site.

== Geography ==
According to the United States Census Bureau, the city has a total area of 1.26 square miles (3.26 km^{2}), all land.

== Demographics ==
Historical populations
Year	Pop.	±%
1900	426	—
1910	473	+11.0%
1920	616	+30.2%
1930	568	−7.8%
1940	544	−4.2%
1950	583	+7.2%
1960	717	+23.0%
1970	1,094	+52.6%
1980	1,312	+19.9%
1990	1,268	−3.4%
2000	1,306	+3.0%
2010	1,489	+14.0%
2020	1,543	+3.6%
Source:"U.S. Census website". United States Census Bureau. and Iowa Data Center; Source: U.S. Decennial Census

=== 2020 census ===
As of the 2020 census, Slater had a population of 1,543 in 623 households, including 424 families. The population density was 805.4 inhabitants per square mile (311.0/km^{2}), and there were 644 housing units at an average density of 336.1 per square mile (129.8/km^{2}).

The median age was 37.8 years. 23.3% of residents were under the age of 18 and 16.3% were 65 years of age or older. The gender makeup of the city was 50.6% male and 49.4% female. For every 100 females there were 102.2 males, and for every 100 females age 18 and over there were 103.1 males age 18 and over.

Of all households, 31.9% had children under the age of 18 living in them. Of all households, 56.0% were married-couple households, 7.7% were cohabiting-couple households, 17.2% had a male householder with no spouse or partner present, and 19.1% had a female householder with no spouse or partner present. About 31.9% of households were non-families, 24.4% were made up of individuals, and 9.2% had someone living alone who was 65 years of age or older.

Of all housing units, 3.3% were vacant. The homeowner vacancy rate was 1.1% and the rental vacancy rate was 1.0%. 0.0% of residents lived in urban areas, while 100.0% lived in rural areas.

Racial composition as of the 2020 census
Race	Number	Percent
White	1,457	94.4%
Black or African American	4	0.3%
American Indian and Alaska Native	8	0.5%
Asian	6	0.4%
Native Hawaiian and Other Pacific Islander	0	0.0%
Some other race	14	0.9%
Two or more races	54	3.5%
Hispanic or Latino (of any race)	30	1.9%

=== 2010 census ===
As of the census of 2010, there were 1,489 people, 589 households, and 418 families living in the city. The population density was 1,181.7 inhabitants per square mile (456.3/km^{2}). There were 614 housing units at an average density of 487.3 per square mile (188.1/km^{2}). The racial makeup of the city was 98.5% White, 0.3% African American, 0.2% Native American, 0.8% from other races, and 0.1% from two or more races. Hispanic or Latino of any race were 1.3% of the population.

There were 589 households, of which 35.5% had children under the age of 18 living with them, 60.8% were married couples living together, 6.5% had a female householder with no husband present, 3.7% had a male householder with no wife present, and 29.0% were non-families. 23.3% of all households were made up of individuals, and 9.7% had someone living alone who was 65 years of age or older. The average household size was 2.53 and the average family size was 3.02.

The median age in the city was 35.7 years. 26.5% of residents were under the age of 18; 7.5% were between the ages of 18 and 24; 29.5% were from 25 to 44; 24.1% were from 45 to 64; and 12.3% were 65 years of age or older. The gender makeup of the city was 51.7% male and 48.3% female.

=== 2000 census ===
As of the census of 2000, there were 1,306 people, 532 households, and 369 families living in the city. The population density was 1,057.6 inhabitants per square mile (408.3/km^{2}). There were 555 housing units at an average density of 449.4 per square mile (173.5/km^{2}). The racial makeup of the city was 99.46% White, 0.31% African American, 0.15% Asian, and 0.08% from two or more races.

There were 532 households, out of which 34.6% had children under the age of 18 living with them, 61.7% were married couples living together, 5.8% had a female householder with no husband present, and 30.6% were non-families. 28.0% of all households were made up of individuals, and 13.9% had someone living alone who was 65 years of age or older. The average household size was 2.45 and the average family size was 3.03.

26.7% are under the age of 18, 6.4% from 18 to 24, 28.9% from 25 to 44, 24.0% from 45 to 64, and 14.0% who were 65 years of age or older. The median age was 38 years. For every 100 females, there were 94.1 males. For every 100 females age 18 and over, there were 85.8 males.

The median income for a household in the city was $45,417, and the median income for a family was $58,036. Males had a median income of $37,760 versus $27,031 for females. The per capita income for the city was $20,647. About 0.6% of families and 2.0% of the population were below the poverty line, including none of those under age 18 and 7.8% of those age 65 or over.

== Education ==
The Ballard Community School District operates local area public schools.

== See also ==
- High Trestle Trail
