= National Register of Historic Places listings in Story County, Iowa =

Location of Story County in Iowa

This is a list of the National Register of Historic Places listings in Story County, Iowa.

This is intended to be a complete list of the properties and districts on the National Register of Historic Places in Story County, Iowa, United States. Latitude and longitude coordinates are provided for many National Register properties and districts; these locations may be seen together in a map.

There are 38 properties and districts listed on the National Register in the county, including 1 National Historic Landmark.

This National Park Service list is complete through NPS recent listings posted October 23, 2026.

== Current listings ==
| | Name on the Register | Image | Date listed | Location | City or town | Description |
|---|---|---|---|---|---|---|
| 1 | Agriculture Hall | Agriculture Hall | June 27, 1985 (#85001374) | Iowa State University campus -- now known as "Catt Hall"; 42°01′40″N 93°38′44″W | Ames | |
| 2 | Alumni Hall | Alumni Hall | November 16, 1978 (#78001260) | Iowa State University campus -- now known as the "Enrollment Services Center"; 42°01′30″N 93°38′56″W | Ames | |
| 3 | Ames High School | Ames High School | October 24, 2002 (#02001229) | 515 Clark Ave. 42°01′35″N 93°37′02″W | Ames | Now city hall |
| 4 | Ames Main Street Historic District | Ames Main Street Historic District | May 10, 2018 (#100002399) | Roughly 100-400 blocks of Main & 5th Sts. with cross streets of Burnett, Kellogg, Douglas & Duff Sts. 42°01′32″N 93°36′49″W | Ames | |
| 5 | Bandshell Park Historic District | Bandshell Park Historic District | October 7, 1999 (#99001238) | Bounded by Duff Ave., E. 5th St., E. 6th St., and Carroll Ave. 42°01′35″N 93°36′33″W | Ames | |
| 6 | Briggs Terrace | Briggs Terrace | July 20, 1998 (#98000868) | 1204 H Ave. 42°01′06″N 93°26′18″W | Nevada | |
| 7 | Prof. J.L. Budd, Sarah M., and Etta Budd House | Prof. J.L. Budd, Sarah M., and Etta Budd House | August 8, 2001 (#01000860) | 804 Kellogg Ave. 42°01′16″N 93°36′49″W | Ames | |
| 8 | Calamus Creek Bridge | Calamus Creek Bridge | May 15, 1998 (#98000486) | 325th St. over Calamus Creek; 41°53′04″N 93°22′54″W | Maxwell | |
| 9 | Chautauqua Park and Ridgewood Historic District | | July 1, 2026 (#100012736) | Ridgewood Avenue, Brookridge Avenue, Orchard Drive; 42°02′01″N 93°37′39″W | Ames | |
| 10 | Christian Petersen Courtyard Sculptures, and Dairy Industry Building | Christian Petersen Courtyard Sculptures, and Dairy Industry Building | April 7, 1987 (#87000020) | Wallace Rd., between Beach and Union Dr. on the Iowa State University campus - now known as the 'Food Sciences' building 42°01′37″N 93°38′34″W | Ames | |
| 11 | Colonials Club House | Colonials Club House | February 8, 2012 (#12000003) | 217 Ash Ave. 42°01′16″N 93°38′42″W | Ames | |
| 12 | Cranford Apartment Building | | July 24, 2023 (#100009150) | 103 Stanton Ave. 42°01′21″N 93°38′56″W | Ames | |
| 13 | Delta Upsilon Chapter House | Delta Upsilon Chapter House | November 10, 2010 (#10000919) | 117 Ash Ave. 42°01′19″N 93°38′41″W | Ames | |
| 14 | East Indian Creek Bridge | East Indian Creek Bridge | May 15, 1998 (#98000485) | 260th St. over East Indian Creek; 41°58′31″N 93°23′13″W | Nevada | |
| 15 | Edwards-Swayze House | Edwards-Swayze House | November 14, 1978 (#78001262) | 1110 9th St. 42°01′13″N 93°26′53″W | Nevada | |
| 16 | Engineering Hall | Engineering Hall | January 10, 1983 (#83000402) | Union Dr. on the Iowa State University campus 42°01′32″N 93°39′02″W | Ames | Now called the Lab of Mechanics |
| 17 | Grand Auditorium and Hotel Block | Grand Auditorium and Hotel Block | January 25, 1980 (#80001460) | Broad St. 42°11′13″N 93°35′48″W | Story City | |
| 18 | Henry T. and Emilie (Wiese) Henryson House | Henry T. and Emilie (Wiese) Henryson House | April 20, 2005 (#05000317) | 619 Grad Ave. 42°11′16″N 93°36′12″W | Story City | |
| 19 | Herschel-Spillman Two-Row Portable Menagerie Carousel | Herschel-Spillman Two-Row Portable Menagerie Carousel | June 6, 1986 (#86001244) | North Park, Story St., and Grove Ave. 42°11′17″N 93°35′16″W | Story City | |
| 20 | Iowa Beta Chapter of Sigma Phi Epsilon | Iowa Beta Chapter of Sigma Phi Epsilon | February 5, 2014 (#13001140) | 228 Gray Ave. 42°01′14″N 93°38′26″W | Ames | |
| 21 | Keigley Branch Bridge | Keigley Branch Bridge | May 15, 1998 (#98000483) | 550th St. over Keigley Branch; 42°08′13″N 93°36′03″W | Gilbert | |
| 22 | Knapp-Wilson House | Knapp-Wilson House | October 15, 1966 (#66000339) | Iowa State University campus 42°01′48″N 93°38′32″W | Ames | |
| 23 | Lincoln Township Mausoleum | Lincoln Township Mausoleum | September 27, 2007 (#07001004) | County Road E18 at the northern end of Pearl St. 42°09′53″N 93°17′44″W | Zearing | |
| 24 | Gilmour B. and Edith Craig MacDonald House | Gilmour B. and Edith Craig MacDonald House | May 6, 1992 (#91001860) | 517 Ash St. 42°00′59″N 93°38′40″W | Ames | |
| 25 | Marston Water Tower | Marston Water Tower | May 27, 1982 (#82002644) | Iowa State University campus 42°01′37″N 93°39′03″W | Ames | |
| 26 | Masonic Temple | Masonic Temple | September 12, 2016 (#16000608) | 413, 417, 427, 429 Douglas Ave. 42°01′32″N 93°36′44″W | Ames | |
| 27 | Morrill Hall | Morrill Hall | June 28, 1996 (#96000700) | Morrill Rd., facing east toward the central campus of Iowa State University; 42°01′38″N 93°38′52″W | Ames | |
| 28 | Mulcahy Barn | Mulcahy Barn | January 28, 2004 (#03001492) | 25623-710th Ave. 41°59′03″N 93°17′27″W | Colo | |
| 29 | Municipal Building | Municipal Building | May 2, 1997 (#97000391) | 420 Kellogg Ave. 42°01′35″N 93°36′47″W | Ames | |
| 30 | Nevada Downtown Historic District | Nevada Downtown Historic District | May 9, 2003 (#03000356) | Approximately 6th St. from I Ave. to M Ave. 42°01′18″N 93°27′08″W | Nevada | |
| 31 | Octagon Round Barn, Indian Creek Township | | June 30, 1986 (#86001439) | Off County Road S14; 41°57′00″N 93°27′06″W | Indian Creek Township | |
| 32 | Old Town Historic District | Old Town Historic District | January 2, 2004 (#03001349) | Between Duff and Clark Aves., and 7th and 9th Sts. 42°01′46″N 93°37′18″W | Ames | |
| 33 | Pleasant Grove Community Church and Cemetery | Pleasant Grove Community Church and Cemetery | May 28, 2010 (#10000295) | 56971 170th St. 42°06′23″N 93°33′41″W | Ames | |
| 34 | Roosevelt School | Roosevelt School | March 2, 2010 (#10000055) | 921 9th St. 42°01′49″N 93°37′24″W | Ames | |
| 35 | Sheldahl First Norwegian Evangelical Lutheran Church | Sheldahl First Norwegian Evangelical Lutheran Church | May 11, 1984 (#84001599) | 3rd and Willow Sts. 41°51′58″N 93°41′42″W | Sheldahl | |
| 36 | Sigma Sigma-Delta Chi Fraternity House | Sigma Sigma-Delta Chi Fraternity House | July 10, 2008 (#08000684) | 405 Hayward Ave. 42°01′09″N 93°39′06″W | Ames | |
| 37 | Skunk River Bridge | Skunk River Bridge | May 15, 1998 (#98000484) | 255th St. over the Skunk River; 41°59′12″N 93°35′13″W | Ames | |
| 38 | William Kennison Wood House | | June 5, 1995 (#95000622) | Off County Road S27; 41°55′15″N 93°24′22″W | Iowa Center | |

== Former listings ==
| | Name on the Register | Image | Date listed | Date removed | Location | City or town | Description |
|---|---|---|---|---|---|---|---|
| 1 | Silliman Memorial Library | | May 23, 1983 (#83000403) | November 12, 1997 | 631 K Ave. | Nevada | Demolished in 1990. |
| 2 | Soper's Mill Bridge | | February 14, 1978 (#78001261) | December 15, 2003 | N of Ames off IA 35 | Ames vicinity | Destroyed by floods in 1993. |

== See also ==
- List of National Historic Landmarks in Iowa
- National Register of Historic Places listings in Iowa
- Listings in neighboring counties: Boone, Hamilton, Hardin, Jasper, Marshall, Polk
