= Budd House =

Budd House may refer to:

- Glover House (Newtown, Connecticut), known also as Budd House, NRHP-listed in Fairfield County
- Prof. J.L. Budd, Sarah M., and Etta Budd House, Ames, Iowa, listed on the NRHP in Story County, Iowa
- Charles H. Budd House, Montevideo, Minnesota, listed on the NRHP in Minnesota
