= Joseph Lancaster Budd =

American horticulturist

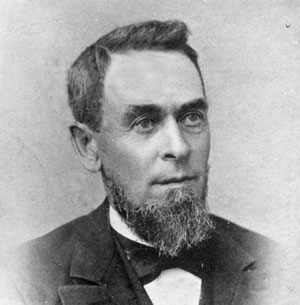
- Born: Putnam County, New York, US
- Died: December 20, 1904; Phoenix, Arizona
- Occupations: Professor and horticulturist

Joseph Lancaster Budd (1834? – December 20, 1904) was an American professor and horticulturist. Iowa State College employed him and was part of the Iowa State Horticultural Society, among others. His work involved fruit trees and other plants, but particularly apples.

== Personal life ==
Budd was born in Putnam County, New York, on his parents' farm in 1834, 1835, or 1837. His parents were Joseph Budd Sr. and Maria Sutten Budd. He was educated in the Monticello, New York public schools and Monticello Academy. Budd attended two colleges in New York, which were Union College and the State Normal School of New York. Budd and Sarah Martha Breed were married in Iowa City on January 26, 1860. They had a son and daughter, Etta May Budd and Allen Joseph Budd. Budd died on December 20, 1904, in Phoenix, Arizona and was buried in Ames Municipal Cemetery. His home in Ames, Iowa, is on the National Register of Historic Places.

== Early career and professorship ==
In about 1855 or 1857, Budd traveled to Rockford, Illinois, where he became the principal of Rockford Academy. He purchased farmland in Benton County, Iowa, in 1858 and started the Benton County Orchards, where he grew about 200 acres of fruit trees. With the help of agents, Budd marketed his fruit to highly populated parts of Iowa. He co-founded the Iowa State Horticultural Society, of which he was its secretary for almost all years spanning from 1873 to 1896. During his tenure as secretary, he wrote "Orcharding in the Open Prairies of Northern Iowa" for the society's first volume of proceedings, earned first place on Iowa State Fair horticultural exhibits in 1874, and became an honorary member of the American Pomological Society along with other similar societies. In 1877, Budd was hired by the Iowa Agricultural College, where he was a professor of horticulture and head of the Horticulture Department until 1898. While working as a professor, Budd introduced varieties of fruits, trees, and shrubs. Other positions Budd held were as a temporary president of Iowa State College and a horticulturist at an Experimental Station. Budd resigned from being a professor in 1899, after which he became a professor emeritus.

== Experiments and publications ==
Budd visited England, France, Austria, Russia, and China during the summer of 1882 to discover fruit trees that could grow in Iowa. He came back to Iowa State College with seed for more than 100 apple varieties, along with varieties of pear and cherry seeds. He also had seeds for various plants, including lilacs, firs, and honeysuckles. Almost all of the apples died over two winters, and the rest yielded poor results. The failures led Budd to resign as the State Horticultural Society's secretary from 1886 to 1890. His position as secretary was reinstated in 1890 due to his discovery that the apple trees grew better in northern climates such as Minnesota.

Budd wrote articles for the Iowa State Register and co-published two volumes of the American Horticultural Manual.
