= List of mayors of Ames, Iowa =

The following is a list of mayors of the city of Ames, Iowa, United States.

- William West, 1870–1871
- C.E. Turner, 1871–1872
- Walter Evans, 1872–1873
- Iraneaus Liter Smith, 1873–1874
- W.D. Lucas, 1874–1875
- William Clark, 1875–1877
- George Almon Underwood, 1877–1879
- Egerton Ryerson Chamberlain, 1879–1880
- George G. Tilden, 1880–1881
- Henry Wilson, 1881–1883, 1894–1896
- John Watts, 1883–1884
- Parley Sheldon, 1884–1886, 1890–1894, 1902–1908, 1910–1916
- Merrill C. Jones, 1886–1888
- Wallace M. Greeley, 1888–1890
- Marcellus K. Smith, 1896–1897
- Lucien Cooper Tilden, 1897–1898
- Sovarro Cramer, 1898–1899
- Thomas Thompson, 1899–1902
- Galen Tilden, 1908–1910
- George Baker, 1916–1918
- E.H. Graves, 1918–1920
- Thomas Lester Rice, 1920–1924
- Frank Hinman Schleiter, 1924–1934
- W.L. Allan, 1934–1938
- Frank D. Paine, 1938–1942
- Hollis Bates Manning, 1942–1946
- Clinton J. Adams, 1946–1948
- William L. Allan, 1948–1953
- Joseph P. Lawlor, 1954–1957
- Pearle P. DeHart, 1958–1965
- Don R. Newbrough, 1966–1967
- Stuart N. Smith, 1968–1973
- William Franklin Pelz, 1974–1975
- Etta Lee Fellinger, 1976–1979
- F. Paul Goodland, 1980–1989
- Larry R. Curtis, 1990–1997
- Ted Tedesco, 1998–2006
- Ann Campbell, 2006–2018
- John Haila, 2018–present

== See also ==
- Ames City Hall
- Municipal Building (Ames, Iowa)
- Ames history
