= The Farm House (Knapp–Wilson House) =

Historic house in Iowa, United States

- The Farm House (Knapp-Wilson House)
- U.S. National Register of Historic Places
- U.S. National Historic Landmark
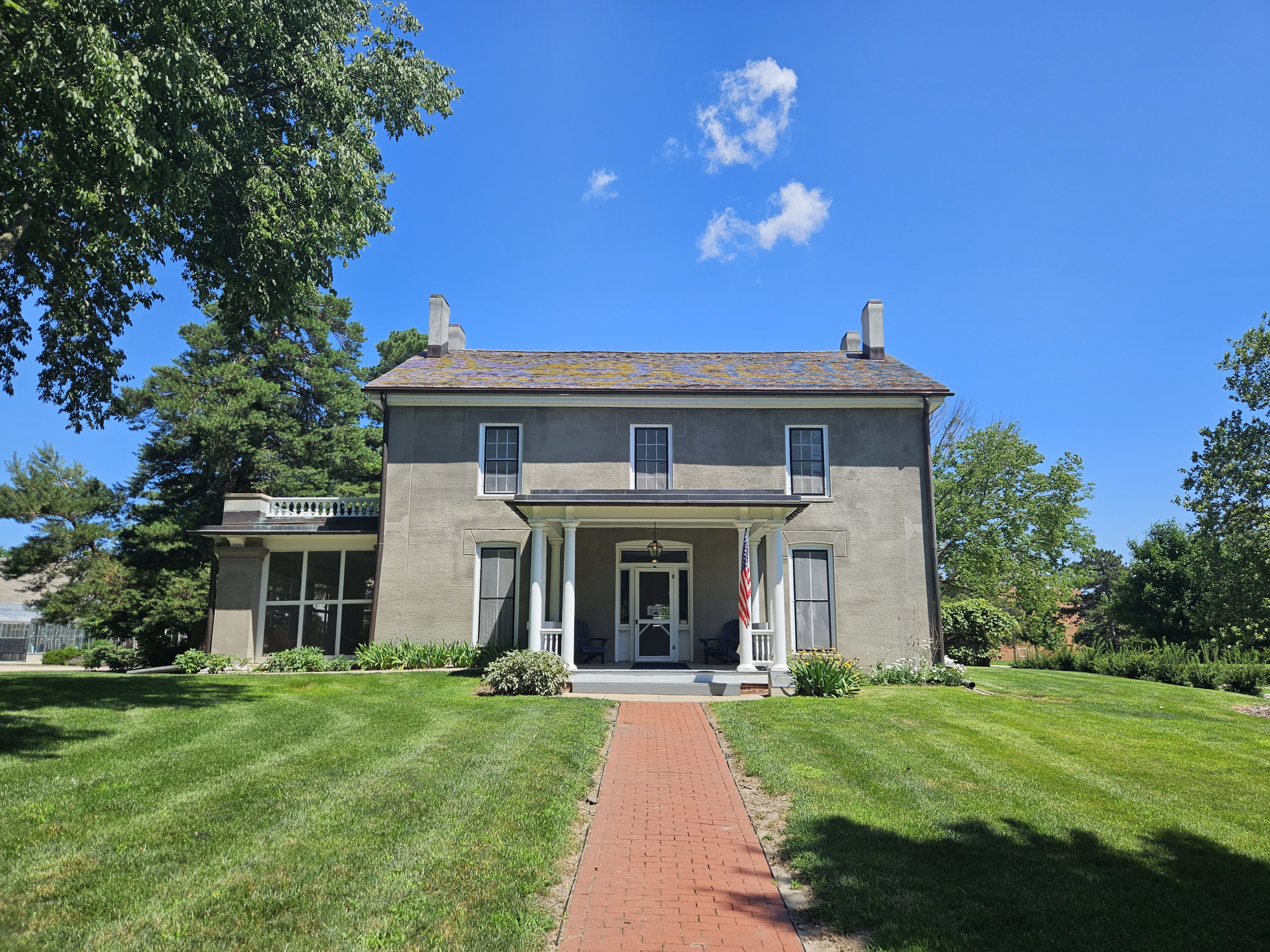
- The Farm House (2025)

- Location within Iowa Location within the United States
- Interactive map showing the location of the Knapp-Wilson House
- Location: 601 Farm House Lane, Ames, Iowa
- Coordinates: 42°1′38″N 93°38′38″W
- Area: 1 acre (0.40 ha)
- Built: 1861
- Architect: Milens Burt
- NRHP reference No.: 66000339

Significant dates
- Added to NRHP: October 15, 1966
- Designated NHL: July 19, 1964

The Farm House, also known as the Knapp–Wilson House, is the oldest building on the campus of Iowa State University in Ames, Iowa. Now a museum open to the general public, this house was originally built in 1860 as part of the model farm aspect of Iowa Agricultural College and Model Farm. It was designated a National Historic Landmark in 1965 for its association with agriculturist Seaman A. Knapp and U.S. Secretary of Agriculture James Wilson, both of whom lived here while teaching at Iowa State.

== Description and history ==
The Farm House is located near the center of the Iowa State campus, on the west side of Farmhouse Lane. It is a three-story structure, built primarily out of brick, and set on a stone foundation. The brick walls, fashioned out of locally sourced clay, were clad in limestone stucco in 1909 because they were crumbling. The interior is largely reflective of a major remodeling conducted about the same time. In 1970 the university undertook a major restoration of the building to restore it to its 1910 appearance. Urban legend states that The Farm House was a stop on the Underground Railroad. This story, though true for other locations throughout the state, is false as the cubby which is said to have hid runaway slaves was installed in the 1890s.

The land for what became Iowa State was donated by Story County farmers in 1858, construction on the Farm House began in 1860, though greatly slowed due to supply shortages caused by the outbreak of the American Civil War. Iowa Agricultural College opened in 1869 with the Farm House and Old Main being the only two buildings on campus. In 1880 Seaman Knapp was appointed farm superintendent and professor of practical and experimental agriculture. Knapp would later become the 2nd President of Iowa State as well as influential in the promotion of modern rice-growing practices in the American South. In 1891 James Wilson moved into the house due to his appointment as Dean of Agriculture. He lived in the house until 1897 when he was offered the post of United States Secretary of Agriculture in the administration of President William McKinley, a post he would hold for sixteen years making him the longest serving cabinet member in American history.

Charles Curtiss would replace Wilson as dean in 1897 and as a result moved into Farm House with his family. The Curtiss family would soon become the longest resident of the Farm House, living there until his death in 1947. In the wake of Curtiss' death, the house was used briefly used by the Home Economics department during the 1948-1949 school year. In 1949 Floyd Andre, the newly appointed Dean of Agriculture, moved into the house and occupied it until 1970. Andre had been a strong proponent of preserving the Farm House which resulted in Iowa State University deciding to restore the house and convert it into a museum upon Andre's departure. Despite numerous delays, the Farm House Museum opened to the public on July 4th, 1976. Over 50 years since opening, the Farm House Museum continues to preserve the history of Iowa State University as well as hosting events for both students and the public.

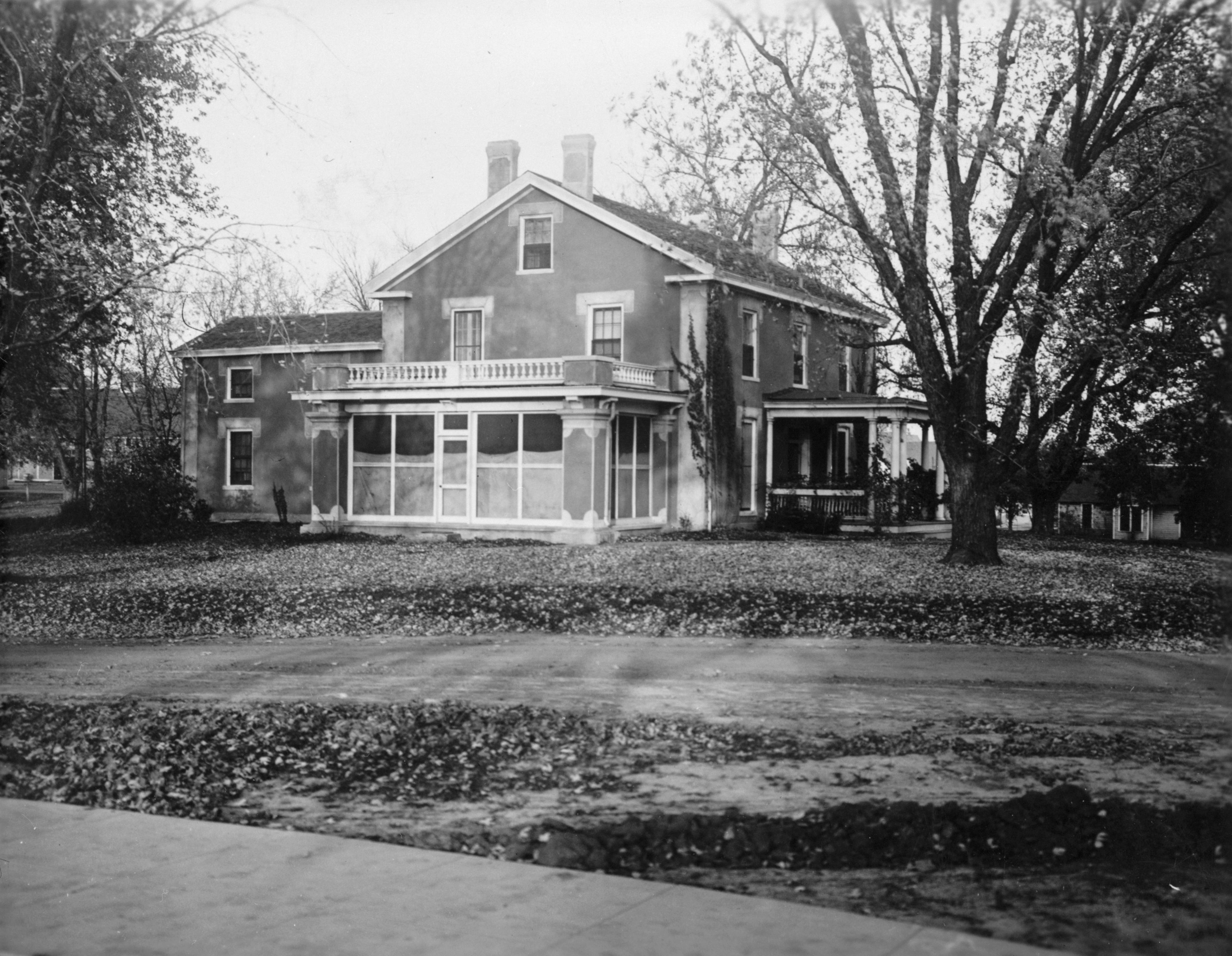
The Farm House in the early 20th Century

== See also ==
- List of National Historic Landmarks in Iowa
- National Register of Historic Places listings in Story County, Iowa
