= Nevada, Iowa =

- City
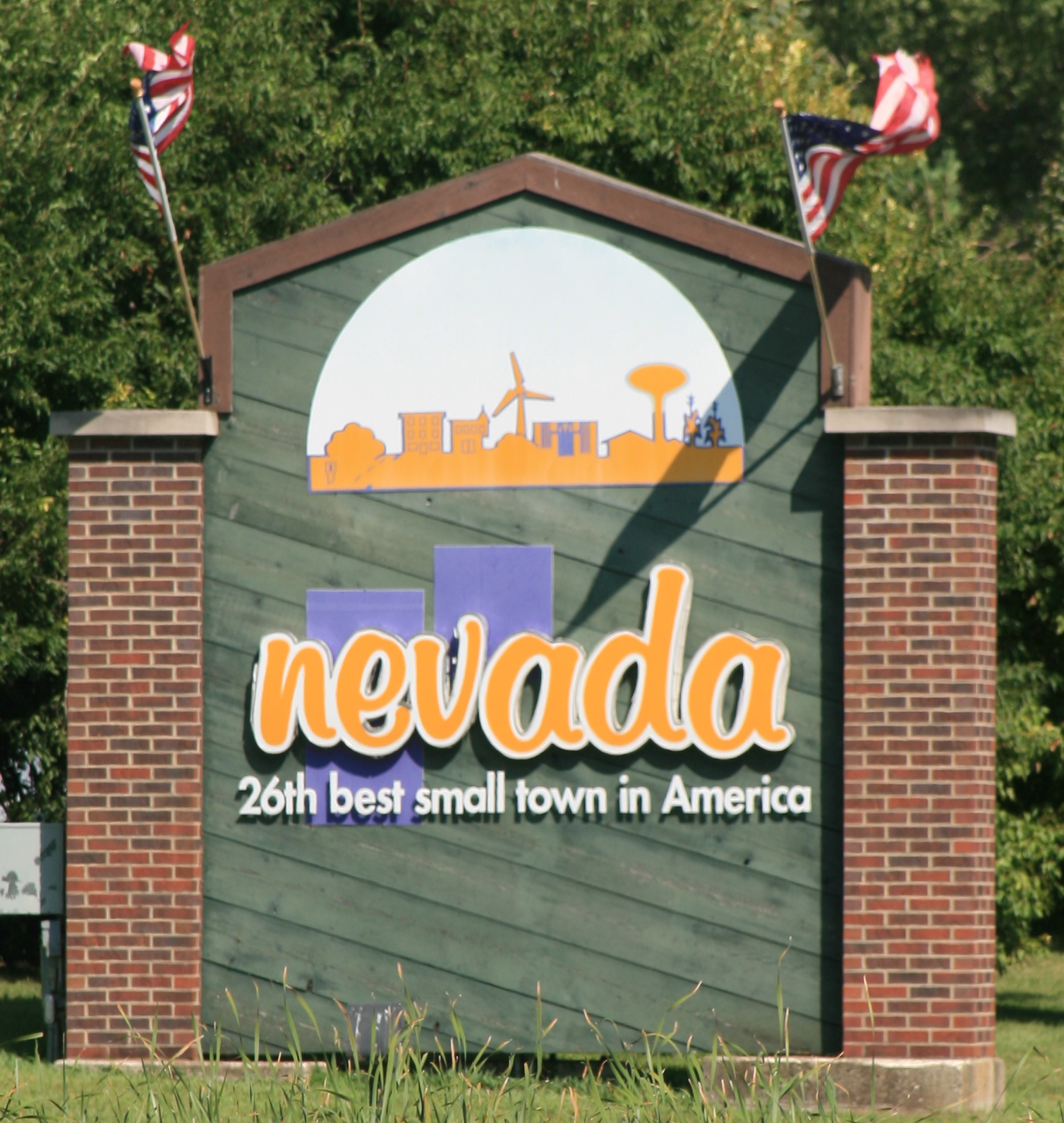
- Welcome Sign in Nevada

- Location of Nevada, Iowa
- Coordinates: 42°01′16″N 93°27′55″W
- Country: USA
- State: Iowa
- County: Story

Area
  - Total: 5.78 sq mi (14.97 km^{2})
  - Land: 5.77 sq mi (14.94 km^{2})
  - Water: 0.012 sq mi (0.03 km^{2})
- Elevation: 958 ft (292 m)

Population (2020)
  - Total: 6,925
  - Density: 1,200.2/sq mi (463.41/km^{2})
- Time zone: UTC-6 (Central (CST))
  - Summer (DST): UTC-5 (CDT)
- ZIP code: 50201
- Area code: 515
- FIPS code: 19-55695
- GNIS feature ID: 2395178
- Website: cityofnevadaiowa.org

Nevada (/nɪˈveɪdə/ niv-AY-də) is a city in and the county seat of Story County, Iowa, United States. The population was 6,925 in the 2020 census, an increase from 6,658 in 2000. Nevada is part of the Ames, Iowa Metropolitan Statistical Area, which is a part of the larger Ames-Boone, Iowa Combined Statistical Area. Nevada is the second-most populous city in Story County. The city’s name is pronounced differently from the state of Nevada. Instead of nuh-VAD-uh (using a short "a"), the city’s name is pronounced nuh-VAY-duh.

== History ==
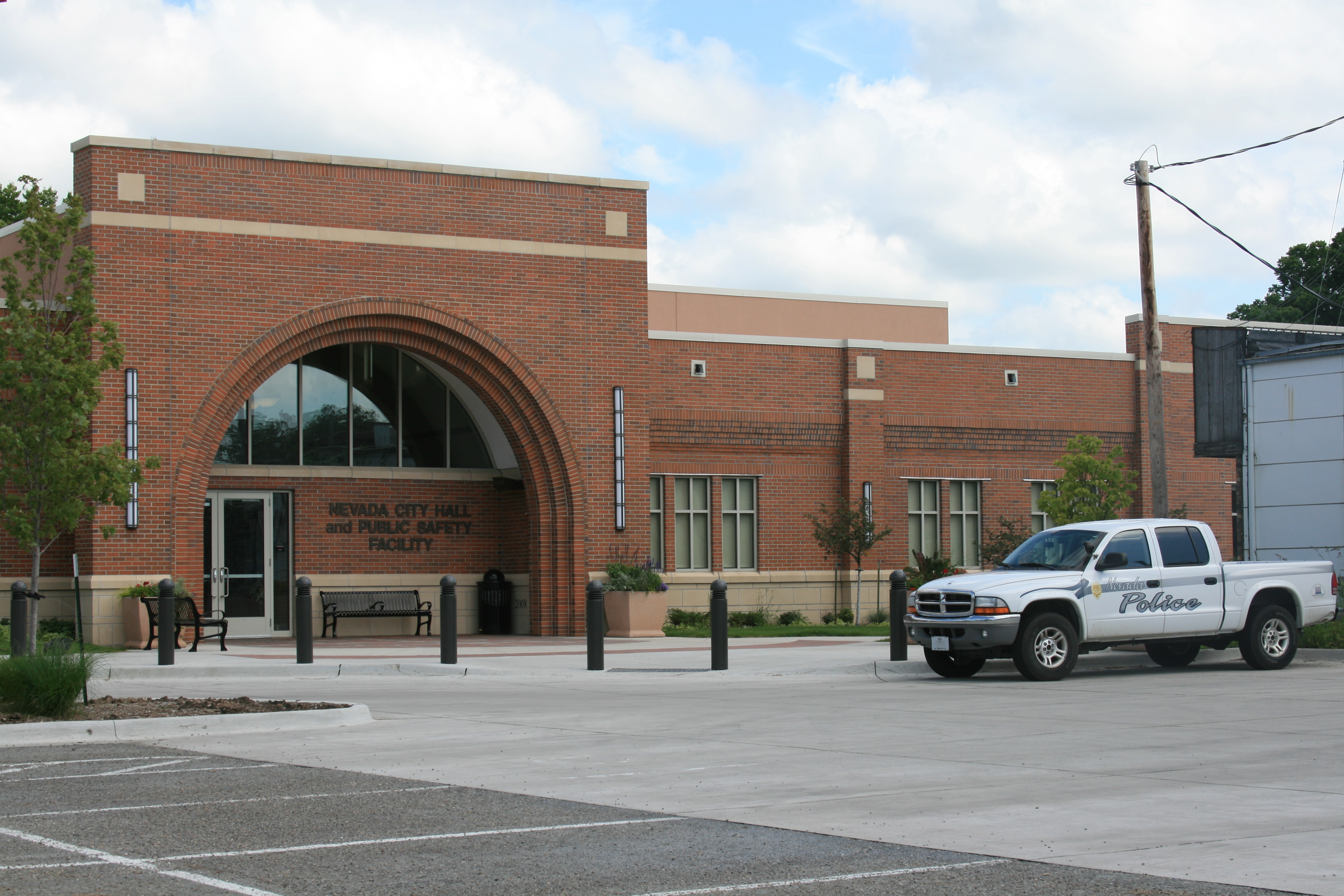
Nevada City Hall

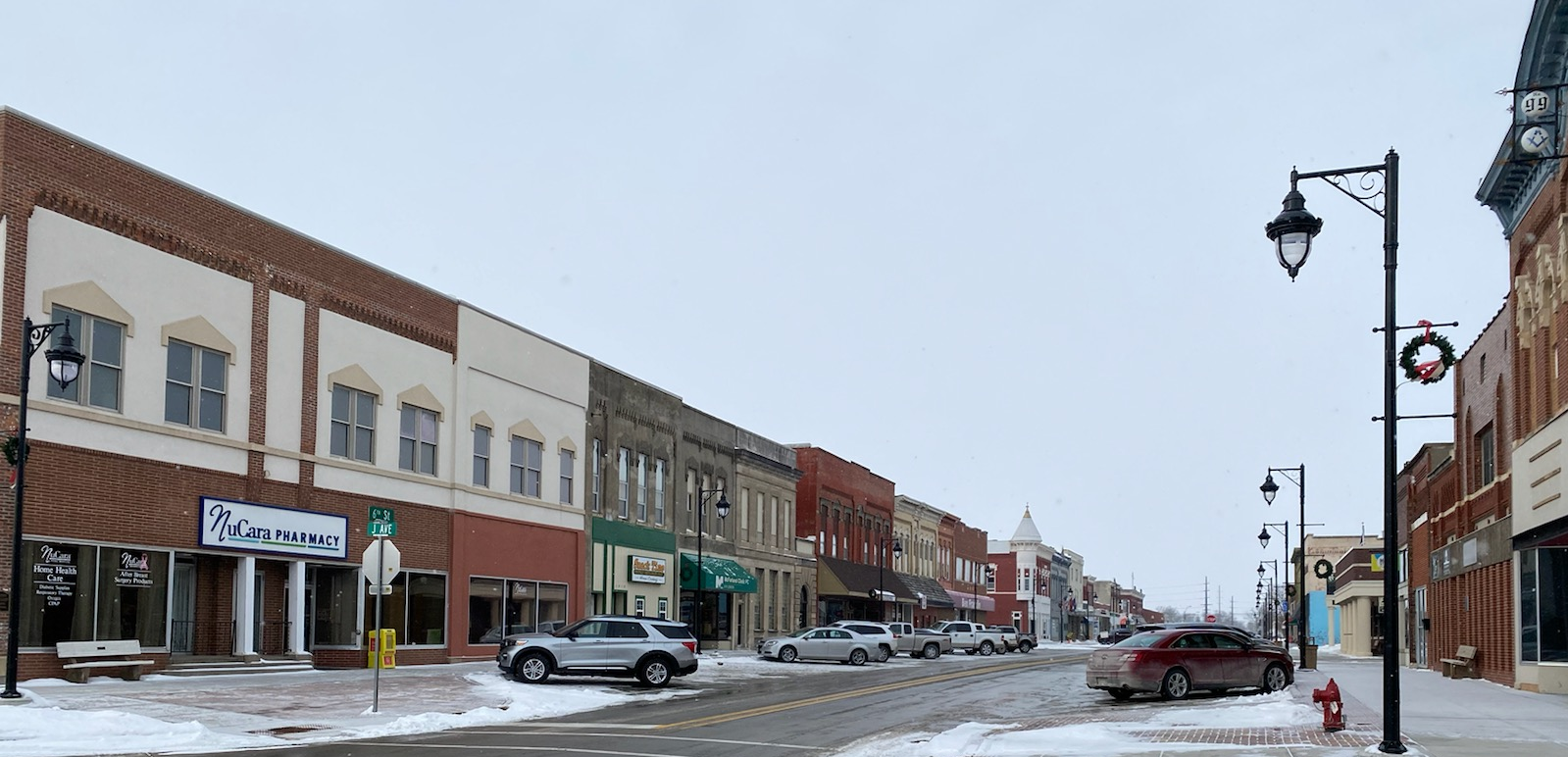
Downtown Nevada

Nevada was platted in 1853 along the banks of the West Indian Creek. A local settler, Mr. Thrift, named the town after his daughter, Sierra Nevada, who was named after the Sierra Nevada mountain range. On October 11, 1853, Theodore E. and Hannah Alderman moved into the first structure in Nevada. This structure served as Pioneer Store, post office, and courtroom. Their son Ulysses Sherman Alderman later served on the Iowa House of Representatives. A post office has been in operation in Nevada since 1854.

Historic properties in Nevada include Briggs Terrace Evergreen Lane Property, completed in 1879, and the Nevada Downtown Historic District, listed on the National Register of Historic Places in 2003. In 2019, the district became the 54th Main Street Iowa community, part of the larger Main Street Programs in the United States.

== Attractions ==
There are numerous attractions in Nevada, including the Story Country Fair, held at the country fairgrounds in town. Nevada also has its own community pool, the Fawcett Family Aquatic Center and the SCORE Recreation Athletic Complex, along with numerous other city parks. A notable private roadside attraction along the Historic Lincoln Highway is Starbucks Drive-In, (not to be confused with Starbucks Coffee) founded by Darrell Starbuck in 1956. The establishment is well known for their soft serve ice cream.

== Geography ==
According to the United States Census Bureau, the city has a total area of 5.08 square miles (13.16 km^{2}), of which 5.06 square miles (13.11 km^{2}) is land and 0.02 square miles (0.05 km^{2}) is water.

== Demographics ==
Historical population
Census	Pop.	Note	%±
1860	350		—
1870	982		180.6%
1880	1,541		56.9%
1890	1,662		7.9%
1900	2,472		48.7%
1910	2,138		−13.5%
1920	2,668		24.8%
1930	3,133		17.4%
1940	3,353		7.0%
1950	3,763		12.2%
1960	4,227		12.3%
1970	4,952		17.2%
1980	5,912		19.4%
1990	6,009		1.6%
2000	6,658		10.8%
2010	6,798		2.1%
2020	6,925		1.9%
U.S. Decennial Census

=== 2020 census ===
As of the 2020 census, there were 6,925 people, 2,880 households, and 1,806 families residing in the city. The population density was 1,203.0 inhabitants per square mile (464.5/km^{2}). There were 3,133 housing units at an average density of 544.3 per square mile (210.1/km^{2}). The median age was 39.8 years. 23.7% of residents were under the age of 18 and 18.1% of residents were 65 years of age or older. For every 100 females there were 99.0 males, and for every 100 females age 18 and over there were 97.1 males age 18 and over.

25.8% of residents were under the age of 20; 4.4% were between the ages of 20 and 24; 26.2% were from 25 to 44; 25.5% were from 45 to 64; and 18.1% were 65 years of age or older. The gender makeup of the city was 49.7% male and 50.3% female.

99.3% of residents lived in urban areas, while 0.7% lived in rural areas.

There were 2,880 households in Nevada, of which 29.4% had children under the age of 18 living in them. Of all households, 47.9% were married-couple households, 6.6% were cohabiting couple households, 20.2% were households with a male householder and no spouse or partner present, and 25.3% were households with a female householder and no spouse or partner present. About 37.3% of all households were non-families, 31.8% were made up of individuals, and 13.2% had someone living alone who was 65 years of age or older.

There were 3,133 housing units, of which 8.1% were vacant. The homeowner vacancy rate was 1.7% and the rental vacancy rate was 11.6%.

Racial composition as of the 2020 census
Race	Number	Percent
White	6,127	88.5%
Black or African American	88	1.3%
American Indian and Alaska Native	23	0.3%
Asian	69	1.0%
Native Hawaiian and Other Pacific Islander	0	0.0%
Some other race	259	3.7%
Two or more races	359	5.2%
Hispanic or Latino (of any race)	438	6.3%

=== 2010 census ===
As of the census of 2010, there were 6,798 people, 2,761 households, and 1,811 families residing in the city. The population density was 1,343.5 inhabitants per square mile (518.7/km^{2}). There were 2,990 housing units at an average density of 590.9 per square mile (228.1/km^{2}). The racial makeup of the city was 94.3% White, 1.3% African American, 0.3% Native American, 1.0% Asian, 1.7% from other races, and 1.5% from two or more races. Hispanic or Latino of any race were 3.4% of the population.

There were 2,761 households, of which 34.0% had children under the age of 18 living with them, 51.3% were married couples living together, 10.6% had a female householder with no husband present, 3.7% had a male householder with no wife present, and 34.4% were non-families. 29.6% of all households were made up of individuals, and 10.5% had someone living alone who was 65 years of age or older. The average household size was 2.38 and the average family size was 2.94.

The median age in the city was 37.1 years. 25.3% of residents were under the age of 18; 7.6% were between the ages of 18 and 24; 27.1% were from 25 to 44; 26.1% were from 45 to 64; and 14% were 65 years of age or older. The gender makeup of the city was 48.6% male and 51.4% female.

=== 2000 census ===
As of the census of 2000, there were 6,658 people, 2,716 households, and 1,787 families residing in the city. The population density was 1,594.7 inhabitants per square mile (615.7/km^{2}). There were 2,882 housing units at an average density of 690.3 per square mile (266.5/km^{2}). The racial makeup of the city was 96.97% White, 0.59% African American, 0.14% Native American, 0.66% Asian, 0.54% from other races, and 1.11% from two or more races. Hispanic or Latino of any race were 1.02% of the population.

There were 2,716 households, out of which 33.07% had children under the age of 18 living with them, 53.5% were married couples living together, 9.2% had a female householder with no husband present, and 34.2% were non-families. 28.1% of all households were made up of individuals, and 11.5% had someone living alone who was 65 years of age or older. The average household size was 2.38 and the average family size was 2.92.

Age spread: 24.9% under the age of 18, 9.8% from 18 to 24, 30.8% from 25 to 44, 20.3% from 45 to 64, and 14.2% who were 65 years of age or older. The median age was 35 years. For every 100 females, there were 93.4 males. For every 100 females age 18 and over, there were 91.5 males.

The median income for a household in the city was $42,527, and the median income for a family was $48,700. Males had a median income of $32,635 versus $24,680 for females. The per capita income for the city was $20,392. About 3.9% of families and 5.6% of the population were below the poverty line, including 4.4% of those under age 18 and 3.2% of those age 65 or over.

== Media ==
=== Newsprint ===
The Nevada Journal publishes a weekly newspaper which comes out on Thursday, and the "Story Today" released on Wednesday. The Nevada Journal provides in-depth coverage of local and regional issues as well as sports and is the official newspaper for the City of Nevada.

National news coverage is provided on a daily basis by the Des Moines Register and the Ames Tribune.

=== Radio and television ===
While Nevada has no broadcast stations of its own, it is well served from the Ames-Des Moines television and radio markets.

Nevada is featured in John Darnielle's 2017 novel Universal Harvester.

== Transportation ==
Nevada is served by US Highway 30 which was known as the Lincoln Highway and Lincoln Way in town.

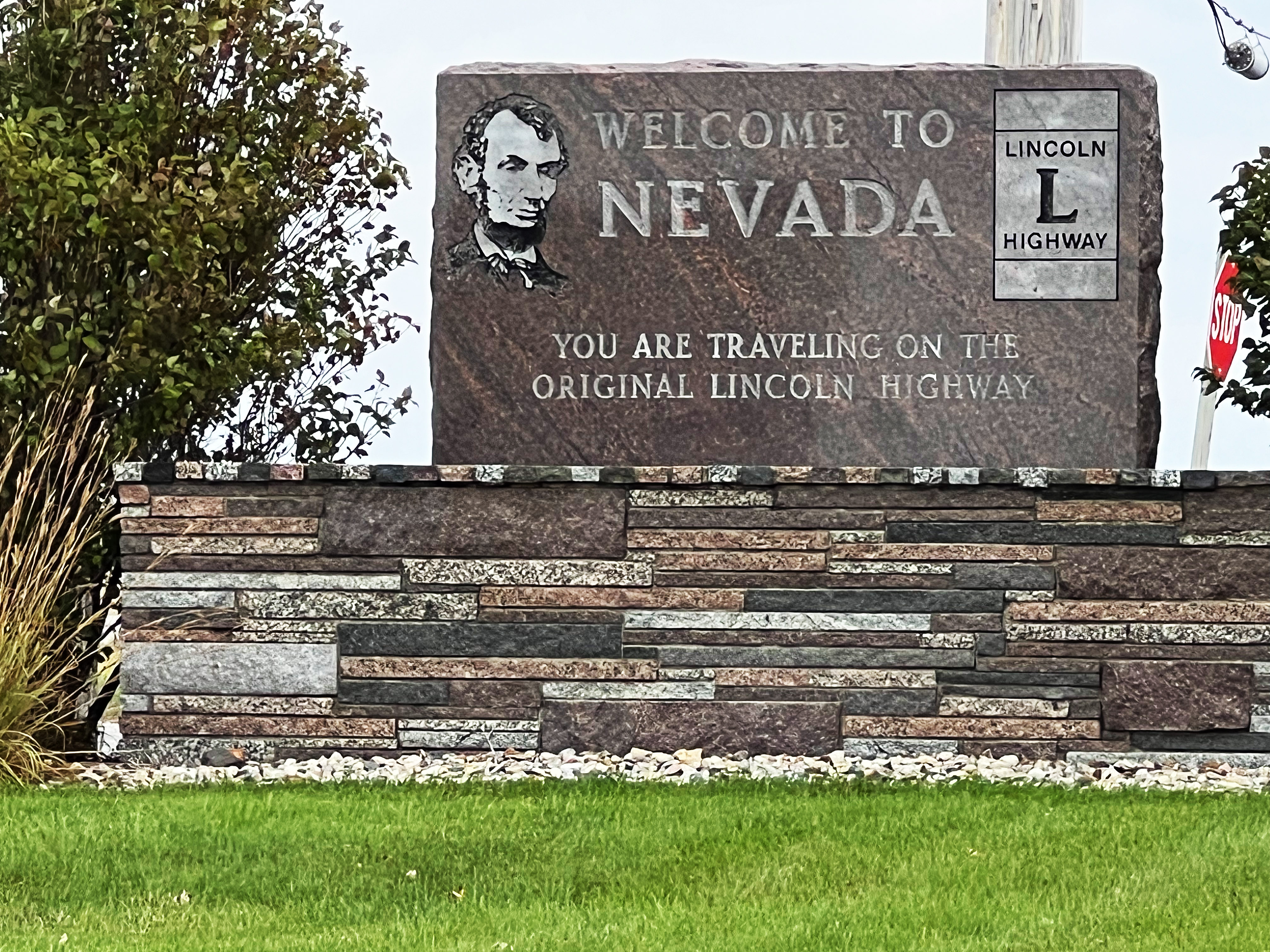
Entering Nevada, Iowa, on the Lincoln Highway.

It bisects Nevada north and south through the business district. A new US Highway 30 bypass was built in the 1970s to the south of the city and Lincoln Way through town was reduced to county road status. Iowa Highway 133 now connects the business district to the new US Highway 30 to the south. Nevada is also served well by a network of paved farm to market county roads.

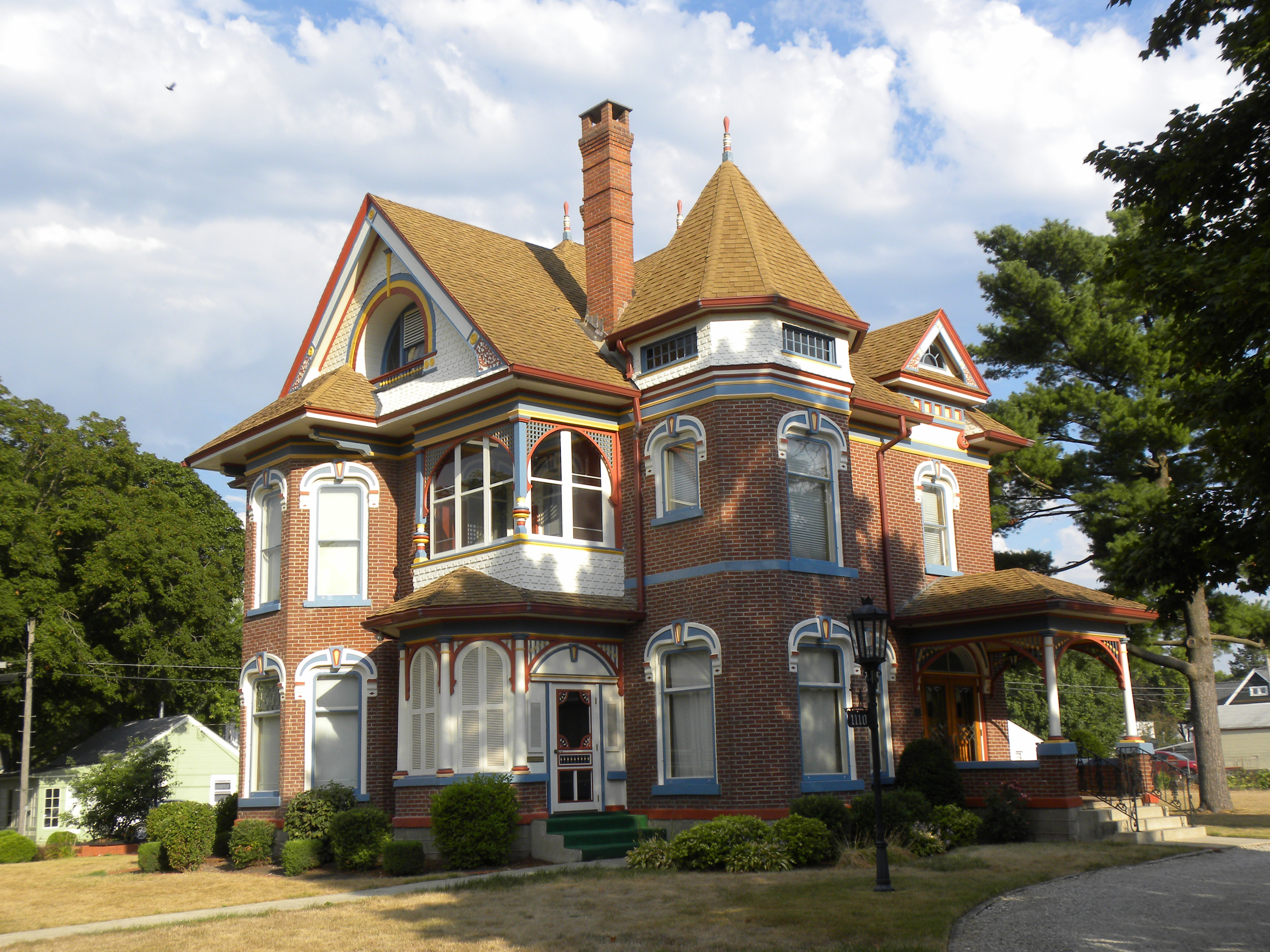
Edwards-Swayze House (built ca. 1878), 1110 9th St. Listed on the National Register of Historic Places

Nevada was served by the Chicago and North Western Railroad. The Union Pacific Railroad now owns the line which crosses the city east to west north of the business district. Up until the mid-1980s, all railroad crossings except for a new one in the northwest section of town were protected by WRRS center harp style wigwag signals. Shortly thereafter, these signals were replaced with standard flashers and gates due to safety concerns and lack of available wigwag parts.

Nevada was also served by the Chicago, Rock Island and Pacific Railroad's "Spine Line" between Minneapolis, MN and Kansas City, MO. This north–south line jogged east–west through southern Nevada. It then veered north again and crossed under the C&NW mainline east of Nevada. An agency station was maintained until 1980 when the Rock Island went bankrupt and ceased to function.

The C&NW purchased the Rock Island "Spine Line" which offered better and more direct connections for Minneapolis and Kansas City. Since the two rail lines did not directly interchange east of town where the C&NW crosses over the Rock Island, a new connection on the west side of Nevada was built. It goes from the C&NW east–west main line to connect with the former Rock Island on the southwest side of Nevada. The junction on the Spine Line was referred to as "Chicago Junction" while the junction on the east–west mainline was referred to as "Kansas City Junction". This new line necessitated the building of an overpass for the old Lincoln Highway on the west side of Nevada.

The Union Pacific Railroad purchased the Chicago and North Western Railroad in 1995. Rail traffic on both the east–west mainline and the "Spine Line" along with interchange traffic has increased considerably in the years since the purchase.

== Education ==
Nevada Community School District operates public schools. The school colors are purple and gold, and the mascot is a cub.

- Central Elementary School
- Nevada Community Middle School
- Nevada Community High School
- Nevada Community Resource Center

== In popular culture ==
The 2017 novel Universal Harvester by American novelist and singer-songwriter John Darnielle is set primarily in Nevada.

== Notable people ==
- Mary Clem (1905–1979), mathematician and human computer, staff member at Iowa State University
- Dayton Countryman (1918–2011), Iowa Attorney General
- Neva Patterson (1920–2010), actress
- Paul Rhoads (born 1967), college football coach, former head coach at Iowa State University
- John Scott (1824–1903), Civil War Colonel and Lt. Governor of Iowa
- Billy Sunday (1862–1935), baseball player and evangelist
