= Masonic Temple (Ames, Iowa) =

- U.S. National Register of Historic Places
- U.S. Historic district – Contributing property
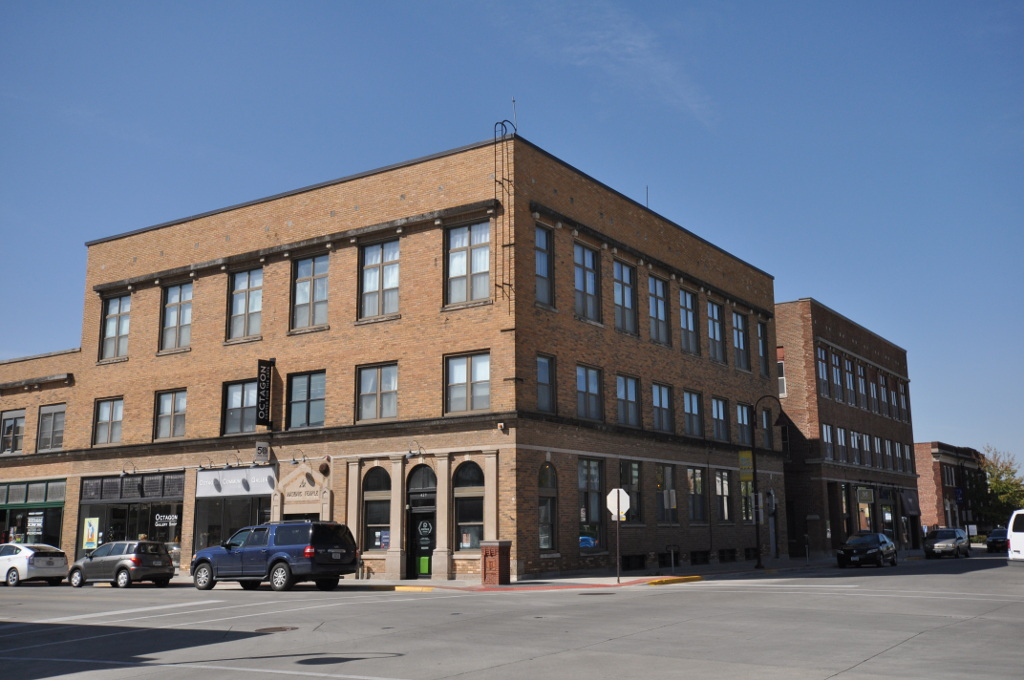

- Location within Iowa Location within the United States
- Location: 413, 417, 427, 429 Douglas Ave., Ames, Iowa
- Coordinates: 42°01′32.8″N 93°36′44.3″W
- Area: less than one acre
- Built: 1917
- Built by: Ben J. Cole
- Architect: Liebbe, Nourse, Rasmussen
- Architectural style: Classical Revival
- Part of: Ames Main Street Historic District (ID100002399)
- NRHP reference No.: 16000608
- Added to NRHP: September 12, 2016

The Masonic Temple, also known as the A.F. & A.M. Hall, Masonic Building, Greeley Building, and the Octagon Center for the Arts, is a historic building located in Ames, Iowa, United States. Built between 1916 and 1917, the three-story, brick, Neoclassical building was designed by the Des Moines architectural firm of Liebbe, Nourse & Rasmussen. It was commissioned by Wallace M. Greeley, an Ames banker and civic leader. The building was built at the high point of Progressive Era construction in the central business district, and with several other noteworthy public and semi-public buildings, marked Ames' transition from a rural town to a modern city. Arcadia Lodge #249 occupied the third floor of the building from its completion in 1917 to 1997, when they built a new building on Alexander Avenue.

The building features multi-colored brick, symmetrical facades, pilasters for storefronts, cast stone columns that flank the main entrance, and a projecting band of cast stone above the third-floor windows. The building was individually listed on the National Register of Historic Places in 2016. It was included as a contributing property in the Ames Main Street Historic District in 2018.
