= Municipal Building (Ames, Iowa) =

- U.S. National Register of Historic Places
- U.S. Historic district – Contributing property
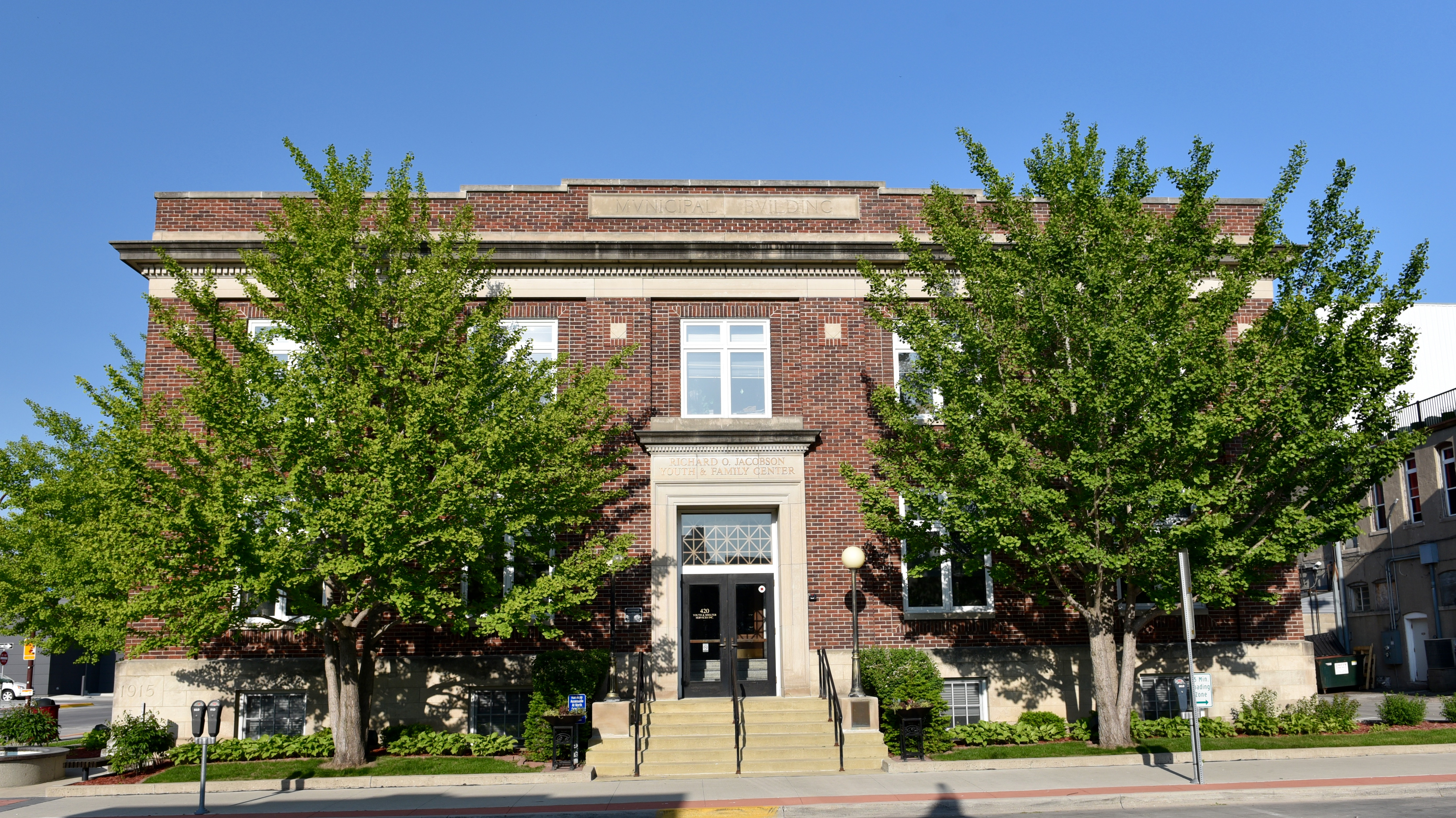

- Location within Iowa Location within the United States
- Location: 420 Kellogg Ave. Ames, Iowa
- Coordinates: 42°01′32.5″N 93°36′48″W
- Area: less than one acre
- Built: 1916
- Built by: J. E. Tusant
- Architect: Liebbe, Nourse & Rasmussen
- Architectural style: Classical Revival
- Part of: Ames Main Street Historic District (ID100002399)
- NRHP reference No.: 100002399
- Added to NRHP: May 2, 1997

The Municipal Building, also known as Youth & Shelter Services, is a historic building located in Ames, Iowa, United States. It is significant for its association with the Progressive Movement reforms implemented by the city in the early 20th century. Previous to the construction of this facility in 1916 the city council, mayor, municipal offices, fire department and the police department, including the city jail and police court, were all housed in separate buildings. They were combined here in an effort to increase efficiency, professionalism, and the scope of city services. Per the Progressive Movement, all of these functions were housed in different zones in the building. The fire department was located on the backside of the building, and the archways where the fire engines doors were located are still visible.

The two-story, brick, Neoclassical style building was designed by the Des Moines architectural firm of Liebbe, Nourse & Rasmussen. It was built by J. E. Tusant of Des Moines for $37,310. It remained the seat of local government until 1990 when it moved into the present city hall. The building sat empty for several years before it was purchased by Youth & Shelter Services, a local human services agency, for their offices. It was individually listed on the National Register of Historic Places in 1997. It was included as a contributing property in the Ames Main Street Historic District in 2018.

== See also ==
- List of mayors of Ames, Iowa
