= Laboratory of Mechanics =

- Engineering Hall
- U.S. National Register of Historic Places
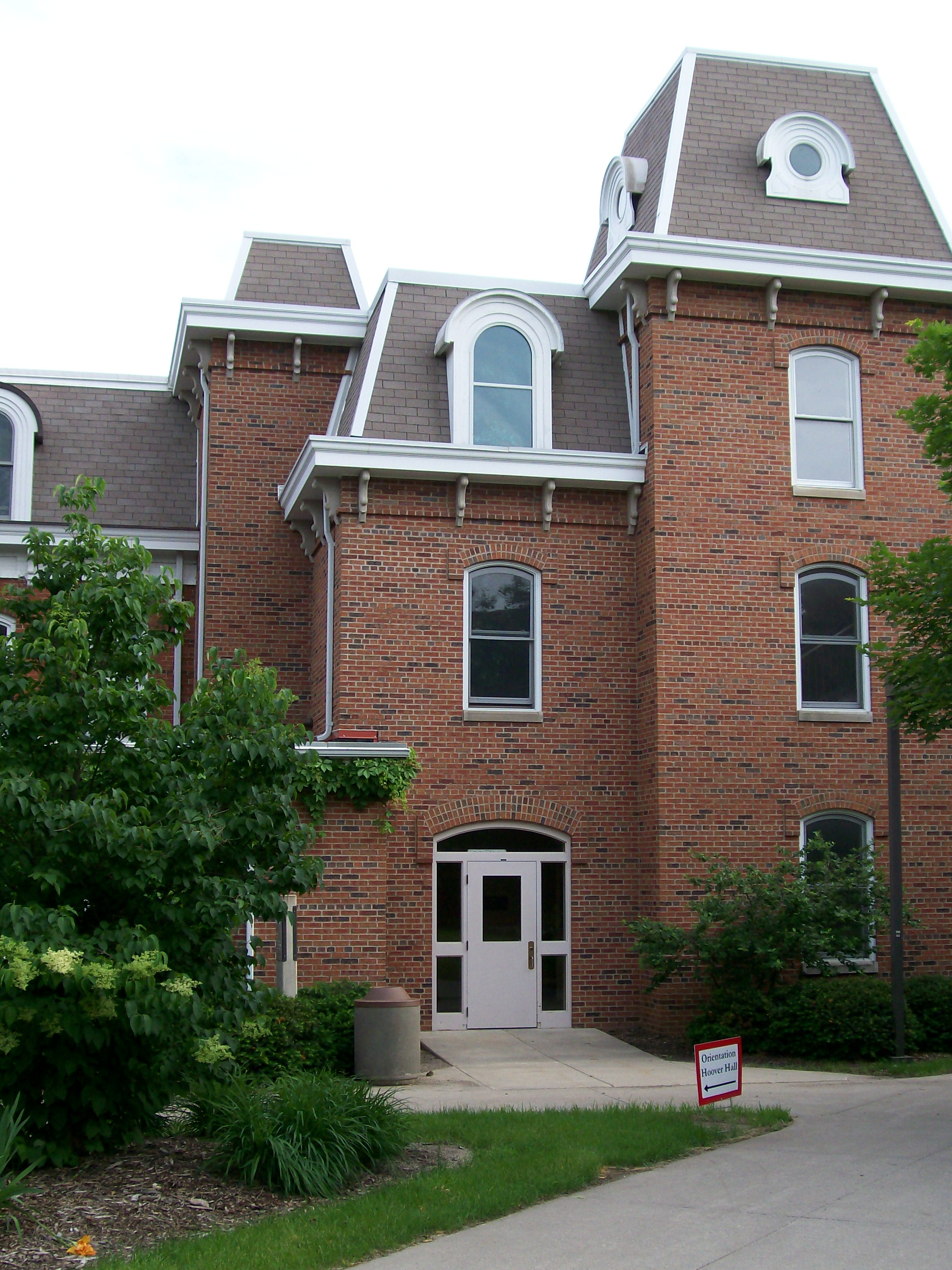

- Location within Iowa Location within the United States
- Location: Union Dr. on the Iowa State University campus, Ames, Iowa
- Coordinates: 42°01′32.2″N 93°39′02.2″W
- Area: less than one acre
- Built: 1883
- Built by: V. Tomlinson
- Architect: J.B. Ballinger; Foster & Liebbe
- Architectural style: Second Empire
- NRHP reference No.: 83000402
- Added to NRHP: January 10, 1983

The Laboratory of Mechanics, formerly known as Engineering Hall, is a historic building on the campus of Iowa State University in Ames, Iowa, United States. The two-story, brick structure with a mansard roof is a simplified version of the Second Empire style. It features a three-story tower with a mansard roof at the main entry. The original building was L-shaped, designed by J.B. Ballinger, and built by V. Tomlinson. Its first addition was designed by the Des Moines architectural firm of Foster & Liebbe, and completed in 1885 by Tomlinson. Other additions were completed in 1933 and 1997.

The building originally housed Iowa State Agricultural College's Department of Mechanical and Civil Engineering. It was remodeled into a laboratory building in 1907. The building currently houses the Architecture Department, Engineering Administration, Faculty Senate, IT Services CIO, and Mechanical Engineering. Its historical significance is derived from its being the university's first engineering building and its survival as the oldest instructional building on campus. It was listed on the National Register of Historic Places in 1983.

== See also ==
- Iowa State University Buildings
