= Nevada Downtown Historic District =

Historic district in Iowa, United States

- U.S. National Register of Historic Places
- U.S. Historic district
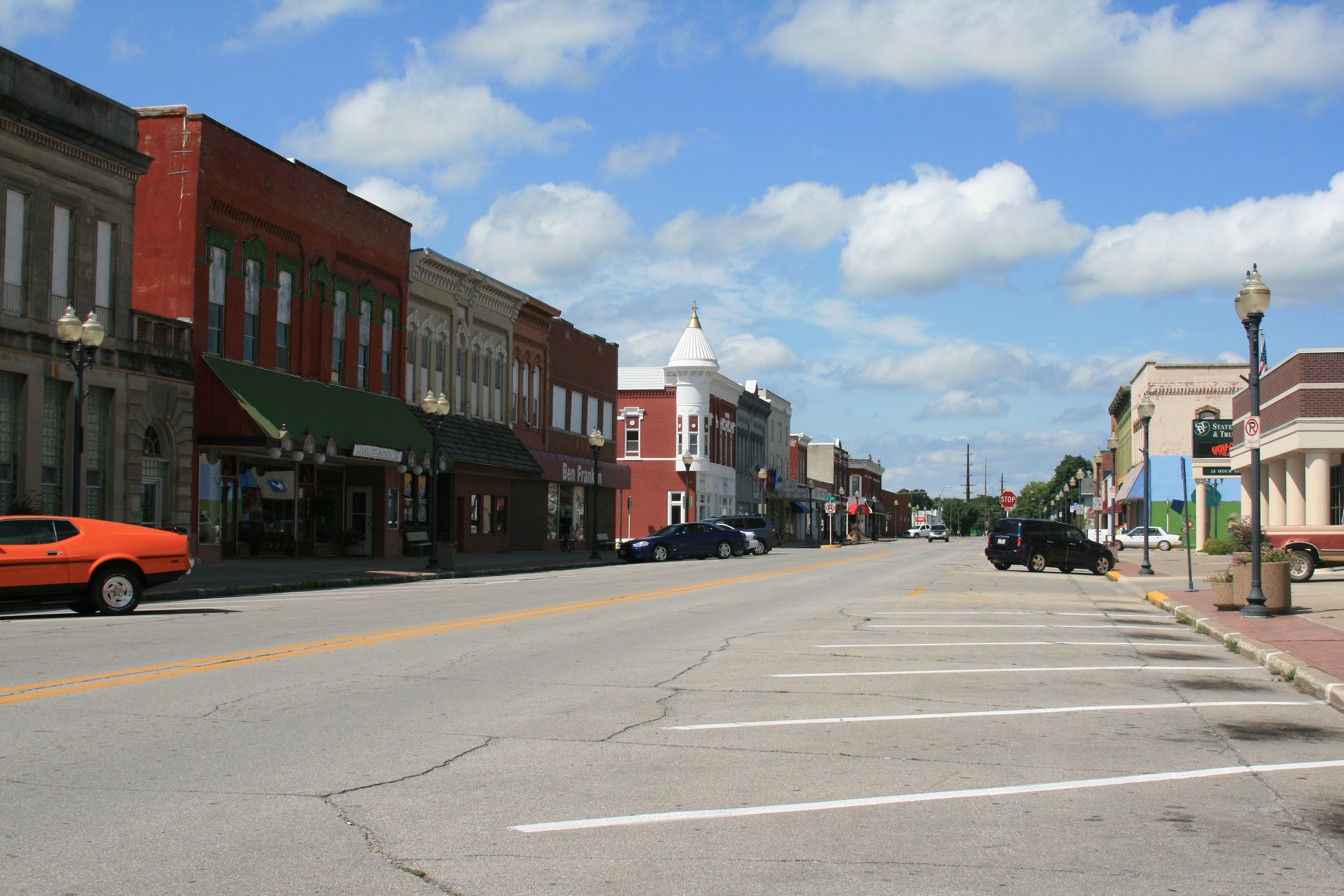

- Location within Iowa Location within the United States
- Location: Approximately 6th St. from I Ave. to M Ave., Nevada, Iowa
- Coordinates: 42°01′18.1″N 93°27′08.3″W
- Area: 10 acres (4.0 ha)
- Built: 1879
- Architect: Boyd & Moore
- Architectural style: Victorian; Late 19th and 20th Century Revivals
- MPS: Nevada Central Business District MPS
- NRHP reference No.: 03000356
- Added to NRHP: May 9, 2003

Nevada Downtown Historic District is a nationally recognized historic district located in Nevada, Iowa, United States. It was listed on the National Register of Historic Places in 2003. At the time of its nomination it consisted of 39 resources, which included 33 contributing buildings and six non-contributing buildings. The district takes in the city's central business district. Its period of significance starts with the relocation of the railroad depot to the head of 6th Street in the 1870s and continues through the late 1920s, when the town undertook several projects in a spirit of civic boosterism. The buildings here are one to three stories tall and are all masonry construction. The architectural designer, Hethe Hanson, included popular styles from the period: Italianate, Queen Anne, Neoclassical, Prairie School, American Craftsman, and vernacular forms. They housed retail shops, hotels, banks, restaurants, fraternal halls, and a creamery.
