= Ames City Hall =

- Ames High School
- U.S. National Register of Historic Places
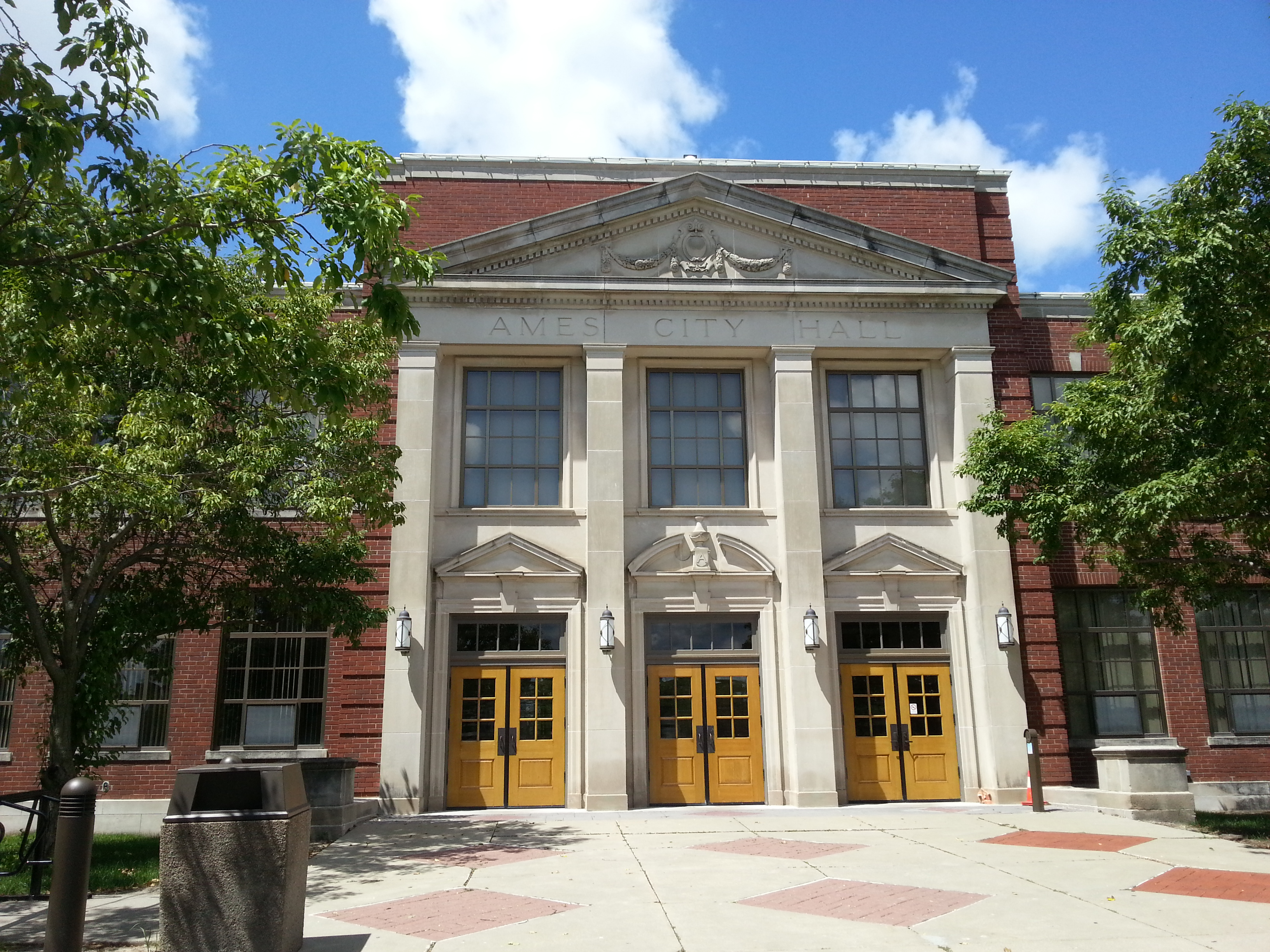

- Location within Iowa Location within the United States
- Location: 515 Clark Ave. Ames, Iowa
- Coordinates: 42°01′35″N 93°37′02.5″W
- Area: 2 acres (0.81 ha)
- Built: 1939
- Architect: Tinsley, McBroom & Higgins
- Architectural style: Classical Revival
- MPS: Public Schools for Iowa: Growth and Change MPS
- NRHP reference No.: 02001229
- Added to NRHP: October 24, 2002

The Ames City Hall is the official seat of government for the city of Ames, Iowa, United States. The building was originally built for Ames High School. It was listed on the National Register of Historic Places in 2002.

== Ames High School ==
Old Central School, which contained elementary to high school grades, was built on this property in 1887. The first building dedicated for high school use was completed across the street in 1911. The same year a second high school building was approved for the south side of Ames. As high school enrollment increased there was a need for a new high school building. Old Central School was torn down, and the Des Moines architectural firm of Tinsley, McBroom & Higgins designed the new building. Construction began in 1937 and it was completed two years later. The auditorium and gymnasium were built using a Public Works Administration grant. When the school opened, all high school students were educated here until 1967 when the present high school opened. This building became Central Junior High School.

== City Hall ==
In the early 20th century the Ames city council, mayor, municipal offices, fire department and the police department, including the city jail and police court, were all housed in separate buildings. The city built the Municipal Building in 1916, which brought together all these functions in the same facility. They remained there until 1990 when the city government moved here.

== See also ==
- List of mayors of Ames, Iowa
