= Lincoln Township Mausoleum =

Historic site in Story County, Iowa

- U.S. National Register of Historic Places
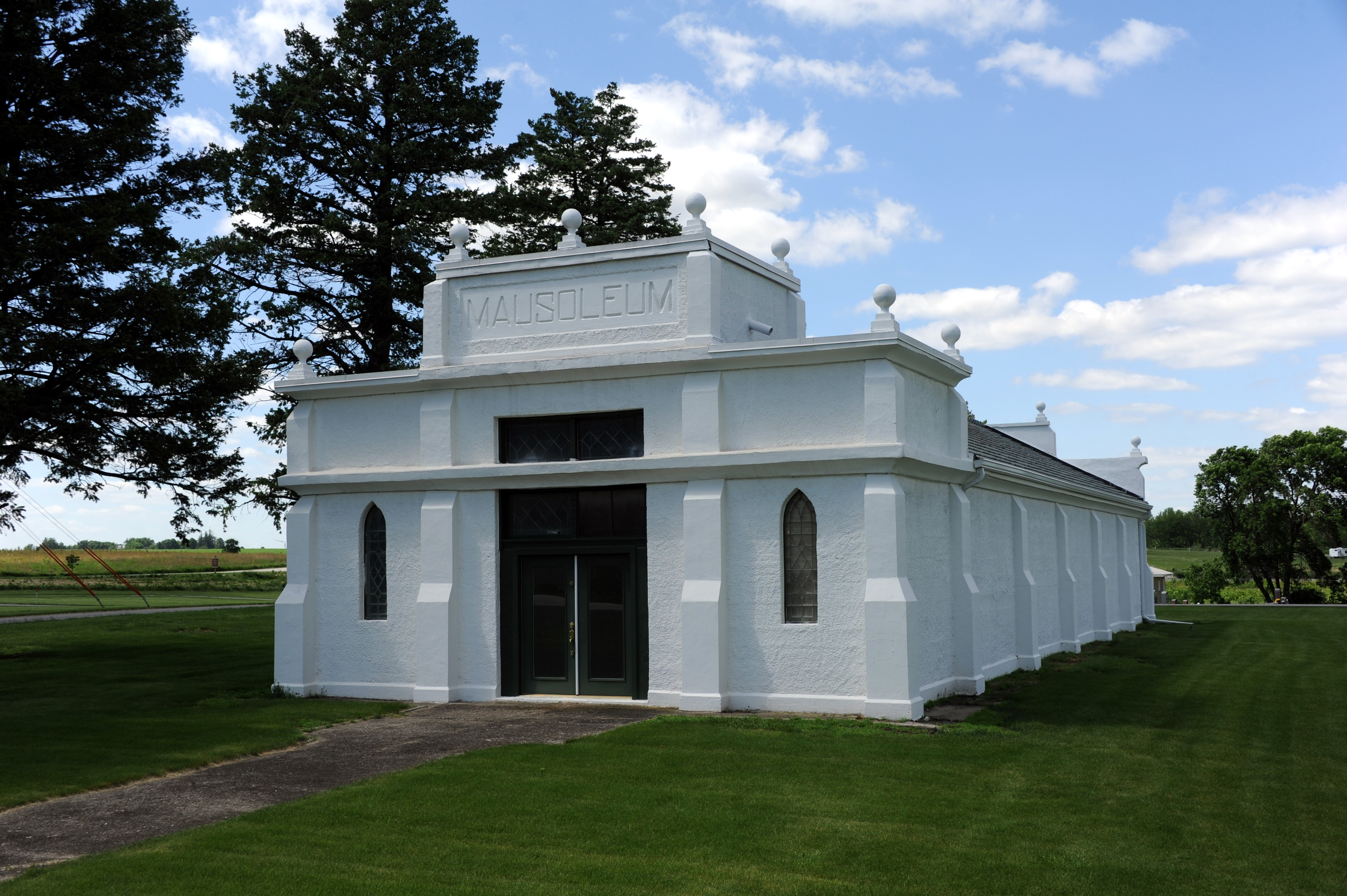

- Location within Iowa Location within the United States
- Location: County Road E18 at the northern end of Pearl St., Zearing, Iowa
- Coordinates: 42°09′59.5″N 93°17′45.3″W
- Area: less than one acre
- Built: 1912
- Architectural style: Late 19th and 20th Century Revivals
- NRHP reference No.: 07001004
- Added to NRHP: September 27, 2007

The Lincoln Township Mausoleum, also known as the Zearing Mausoleum, is a historic building located in Zearing, Iowa, United States. It is situated along the western edge of Zearing Cemetery, near a windbreak of trees. The mausoleum is a single-story concrete structure, rectangular in shape, that was completed in 1912. Most of the building is capped with a gable roof, but the front has a series of three flat roofs. The exterior walls are covered with stucco, painted white. It combines elements of the Mission, Late Gothic Revival, and Neoclassical styles. The interior features a central hall with 100 crypts on both sides. They are stacked in four horizontal rows, and are faced with marble panels. The building is significant for its "monolithic concrete construction used to build a public mausoleum," which is a rarity in Iowa. The mausoleum was listed on the National Register of Historic Places in 2007.
