= Henry T. and Emilie (Wiese) Henryson House =

Historic house in Iowa, United States

- U.S. National Register of Historic Places
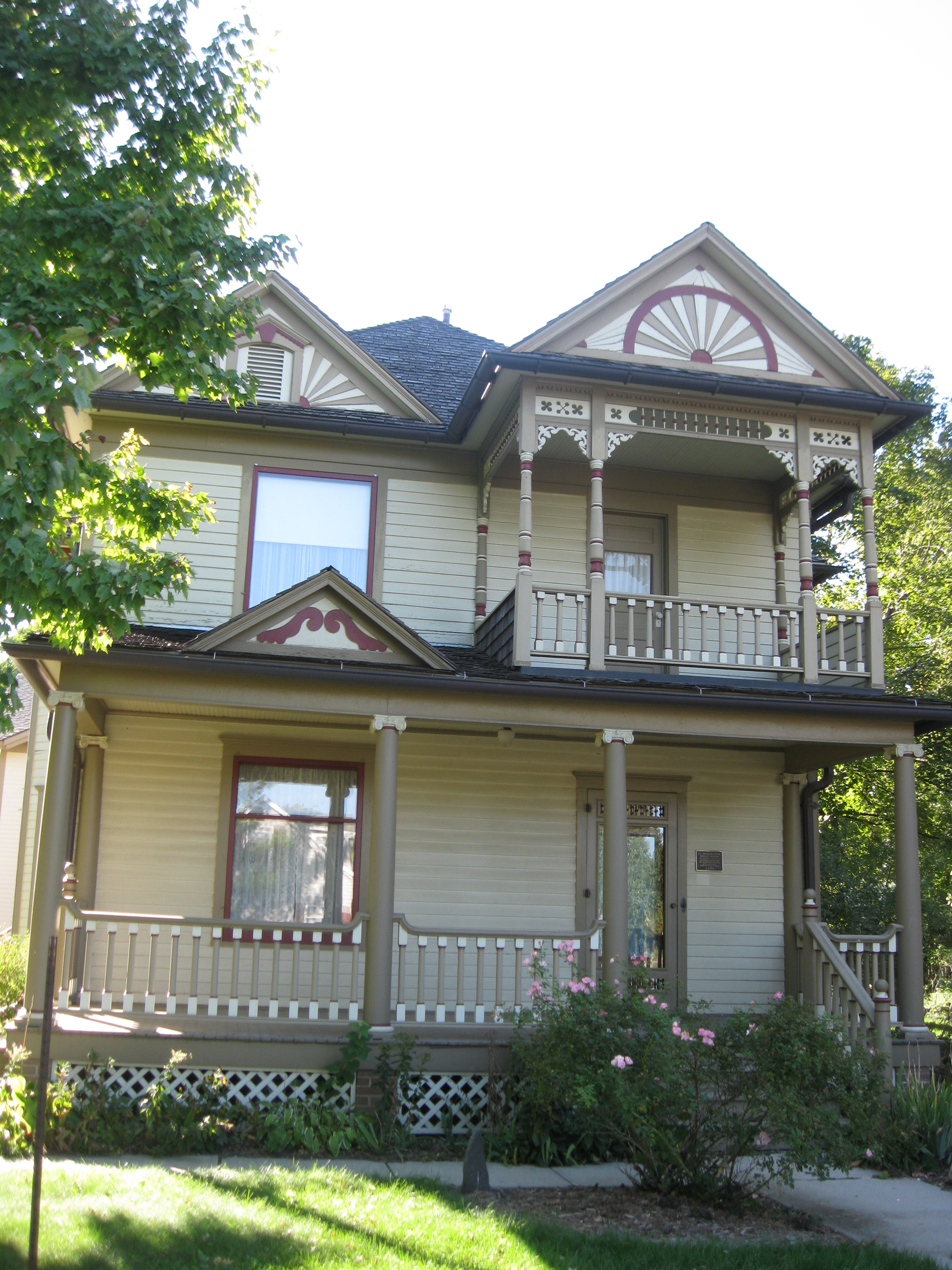

- Location within Iowa Location within the United States
- Location: 619 Grand Ave. Story City, Iowa
- Coordinates: 42°11′16.2″N 93°35′29.1″W
- Area: less than one acre
- Built: 1903
- Architectural style: Queen Anne
- NRHP reference No.: 05000317
- Added to NRHP: April 20, 2005

The Henry T. and Emilie (Wiese) Henryson House, also known as the Bartlett Museum, is a historic building located in Story City, Iowa, United States. It is a fine example of the spindlework subtype of the Queen Anne style, and the best remaining example left in the community. It also reflects the growth and development of Story City by Norwegian immigrants in the early 20th century. This two-story frame house was built in 1903. It features an asymmetrical facade and a full-width front porch on the main floor with second-story porch above the main entrance.

The building was used as a residence until the Story City Historical Society bought it in 1996 with funds provided by Dr. Francis Bartlett Kinne. They converted it into museum, which is named in honor of Dr. Kinne's parents. The house was listed on the National Register of Historic Places in 2005.
