= Old Town Historic District (Ames, Iowa) =

Historic district in Iowa, United States

- U.S. National Register of Historic Places
- U.S. Historic district
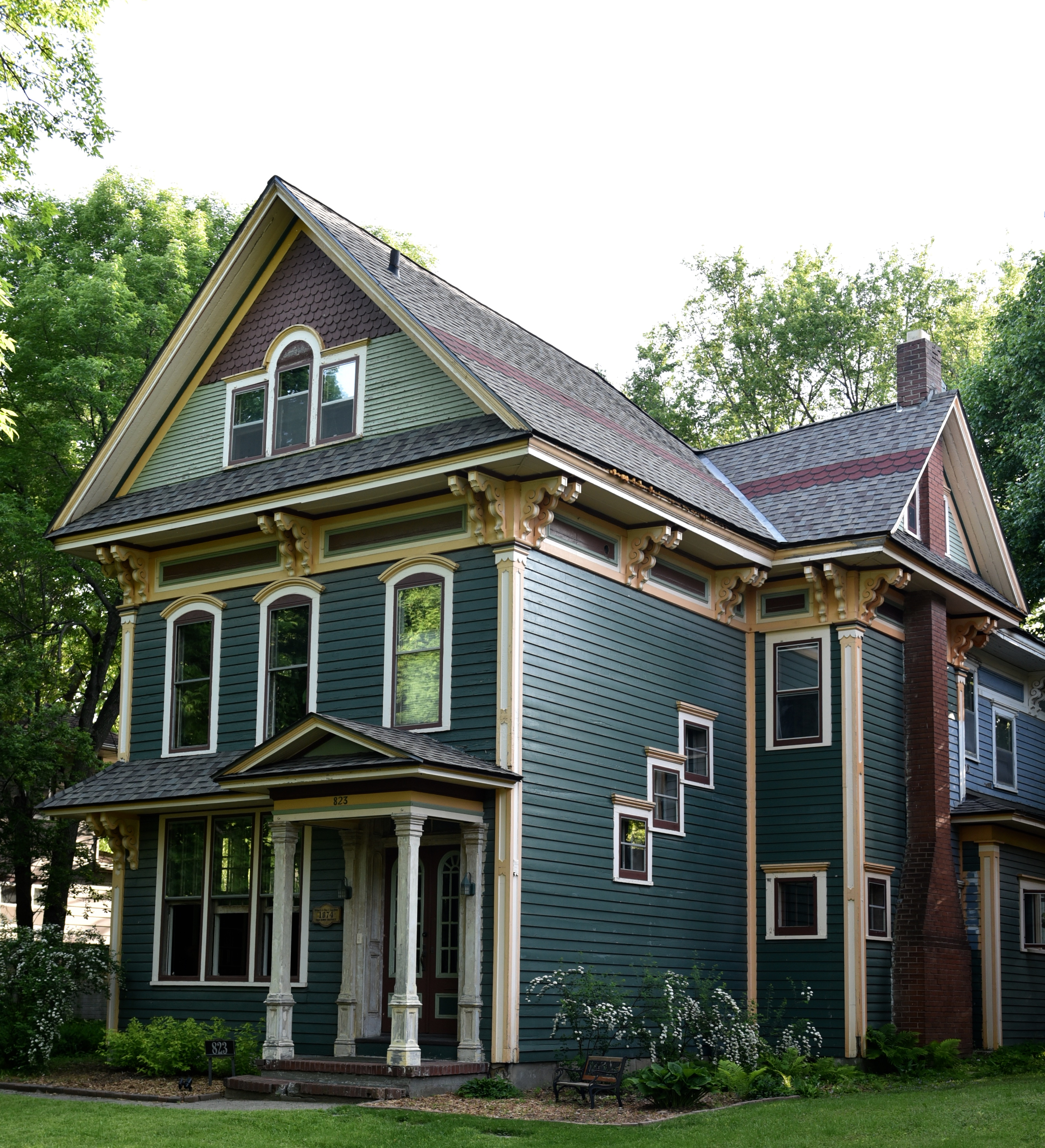
- 823 Douglas Avenue (c. 1874)

- Location within Iowa Location within the United States
- Location: Between Duff and Clark Aves., and 7th and 9th Sts., Ames, Iowa
- Coordinates: 42°01′44″N 93°36′48″W
- Area: 47 acres (19 ha)
- Architect: Charles A. Duntz, et al.
- Architectural style: Late Victorian; Late 19th and Early 20th Century American Movements
- NRHP reference No.: 03001349
- Added to NRHP: January 2, 2004

Old Town Historic District is a nationally recognized historic district located in Ames, Iowa, United States. It was listed on the National Register of Historic Places in 2004. At the time of its nomination it consisted of 249 resources, which included 191 contributing buildings, one contributing site, and 57 non-contributing buildings. The district is a residential area located north of the central business district. Between the two is a "civic corridor" made up of government buildings, churches and fraternal organizations. The earlier residences here were built of brick, but from about 1890 to 1910 they are all of wood construction. Brick reappears in 1910, but as a secondary building material. The houses are from one to two stories in height. They reflect the Late Victorian styles as well as the Colonial Revival styles of the early 20th century. The houses generally have a detached garage behind the house, facing an alley. The Prof. J.L. Budd, Sarah M., and Etta Budd House (1885) is individually listed on the National Register.

Most of the houses are single-family, but a few have been converted to multi-family dwellings. There are also nine apartment buildings and a condominium building located here. All date from the 1960s onward, and do not contribute to the historic nature of the district. They are generally two to three stories tall, but the tallest is five stories. They are large boxy buildings, except the most recent one (1997), which reflects the district's architectural heritage. First Church of Christ Scientist, a frame structure built in 1938, is also a contributing property in the district.
