= Gilmour B. and Edith Craig MacDonald House =

Historic house in Iowa, United States

- U.S. National Register of Historic Places
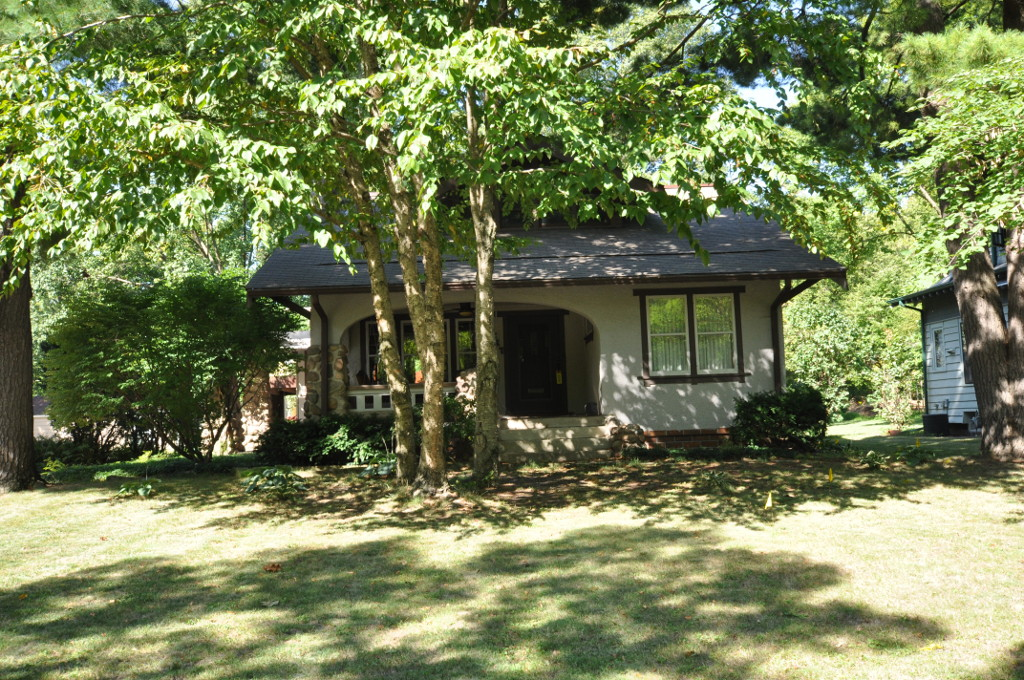

- Location within Iowa Location within the United States
- Location: 517 Ash St. Ames, Iowa
- Coordinates: 42°00′59″N 93°38′40″W
- Area: less than one acre
- Built: 1916
- Architect: Robert G. McDowell
- Architectural style: Bungalow/Craftsman
- MPS: Conservation Movement in Iowa MPS
- NRHP reference No.: 91001860
- Added to NRHP: May 6, 1992

The Gilmour B. and Edith Craig MacDonald House is a historic building located in Ames, Iowa, United States. It is significant for its association with G.B. MacDonald, a leading figure in the Conservation Movement in Iowa, and as a fine example of American Craftsman architecture in Ames. MacDonald was a professor of forestry at Iowa State College, later renamed Iowa State University, from 1910 until his death in 1960. He also served as Deputy State Forester from 1918 to 1935, and as the State Forester from 1935 to 1957. He played a leading role in both forestry and soil conservation, and was an advocate for the relationship between forestry and soil erosion and farming. As Iowa's director of the Emergency Conservation Work program, MacDonald oversaw the Civilian Conservation Corps camps in the 1930s, all which were involved with reforestation or soil erosion control work at one time or another.

Des Moines architect Robert G. McDowell designed the bungalow, which was completed in 1916. Appropriately, it is located on a wooded lot. The house was listed on the National Register of Historic Places in 1992.
