= Mulcahy Barn =

- U.S. National Register of Historic Places
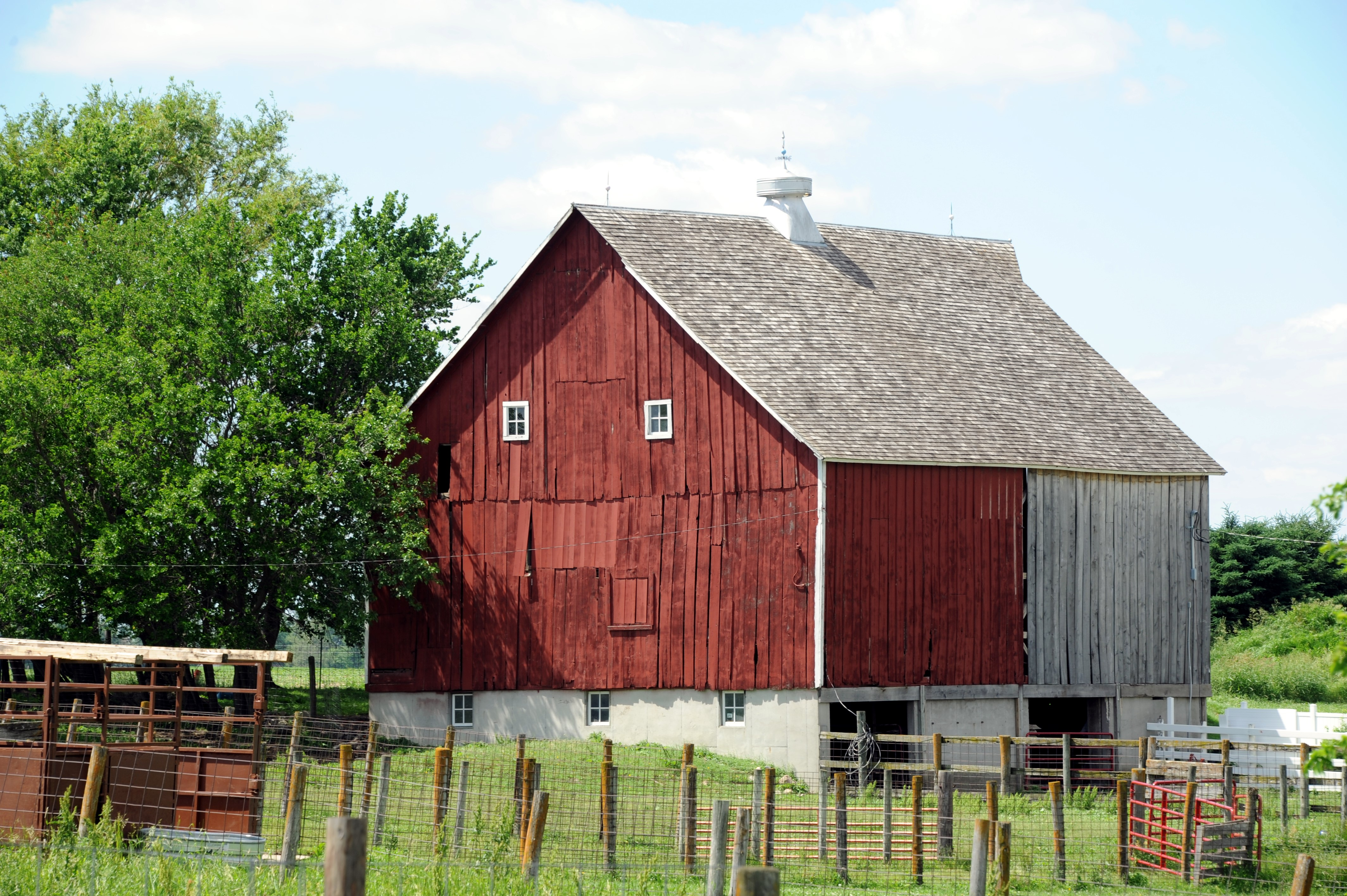

- Location within Iowa Location within the United States
- Location: 25623-710th Ave.
- Nearest city: Colo, Iowa
- Coordinates: 42°59′03″N 93°17′27″W
- Area: less than one acre
- Built: 1885
- NRHP reference No.: 03001492
- Added to NRHP: January 28, 2004

Mulcahy Barn is a historic building located south of Colo, Iowa, United States. It is a hybrid of German and English immigrant barns, and it is considered an excellent example of a bank barn. The German influence was the placement of the livestock on the lower level, while the simple lines of the upper level reflect the British/colonial influence. The Mulcahy's, who built the barn, were more than likely familiar with the latter. They learned the former after their arrival in Iowa, which had a large German and Scandinavian population by the time they arrived. It was completed around 1885 with board and batten siding on the upper portion and a fieldstone foundation. That foundation was replaced in the mid-20th century with concrete, and again with concrete in 2000. The barn was listed on the National Register of Historic Places in 2004.

It has a hay hood.
