= Cranford Apartment Building =

- U.S. National Register of Historic Places
- Location within Iowa Location within the United States
- Location: 103 Stanton Ave. Ames, Iowa
- Coordinates: 42°1′21.3″N 93°38′55.8″W
- Area: less than one acre
- Built: 1922
- Architect: Alda Wilson
- NRHP reference No.: 100009150
- Added to NRHP: July 24, 2023

Cranford Apartment Building is a historic building located in the Campustown section of Ames, Iowa, United States. The 4½-story brick structure was completed in 1922 as a residence for single women who were on the faculty at Iowa State College as well as other professional women. Prior to this building's completion, female faculty members often had a difficult time finding a place to live in Ames. Its construction was funded by the Faculty Women's Housing Company. The building was designed by Alda Wilson, who earned a bachelor's degree from Iowa State. It was listed on the National Register of Historic Places in 2023.
