= Roosevelt School (Ames, Iowa) =

- U.S. National Register of Historic Places
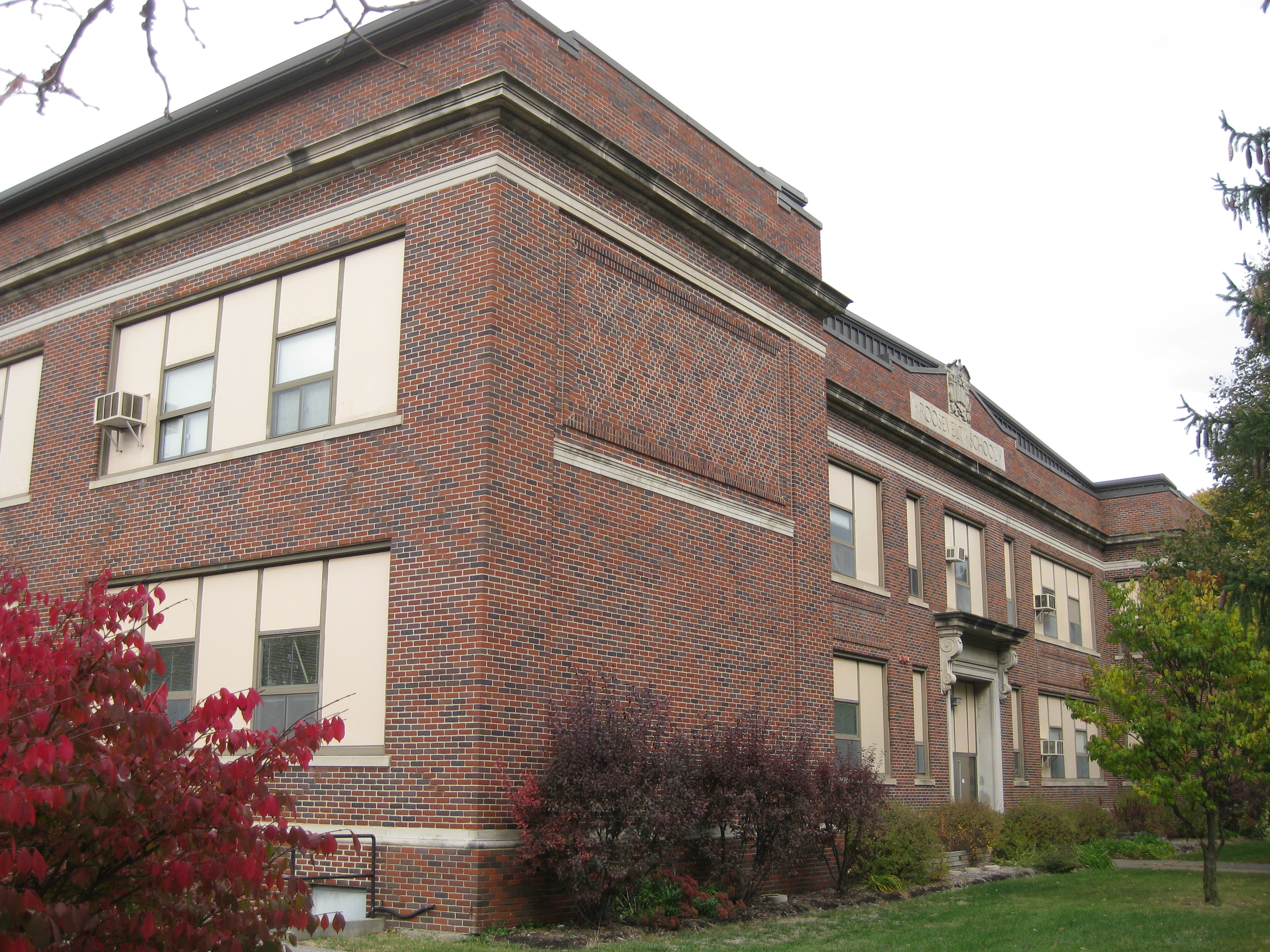

- Location within Iowa Location within the United States
- Location: 921 9th St. Ames, Iowa
- Coordinates: 42°01′50.1″N 93°37′25.1″W
- Area: 2.5 acres (1.0 ha)
- Built: 1924
- Built by: Elvin & Co.
- Architect: Kimball, Bailie & Cowgill
- Architectural style: Beaux-Arts; Classical Revival
- NRHP reference No.: 10000055
- Added to NRHP: March 2, 2010

Roosevelt School, also known as Second Ward School, is a historic building located in Ames, Iowa, United States. It is significant as an example of a Progressive Era school building that served as a neighborhood elementary school from its construction in 1924 until it was controversially closed in 2005. It was designed by the local architectural firm of Kimball, Bailie & Cowgill. It exemplifies the ideals of "ample sunlight, fresh air, and open space for the innovative subjects and learning conditions advocated by Progressive educators." The stripped-down version of the Beaux-Arts style of the two-story brick structure also embodied the progressive philosophy of constructing noble public buildings. During its years as a school, the building served as a catalyst for the development of the neighborhood from the 1920s to the 1950s, and served as its community center, park, and playground.

The school was listed on the National Register of Historic Places in 2010. RES-Development purchased the property and converted the building into 20 condominiums, which opened in 2015.
