= Ames Main Street Historic District =

Historic district in Iowa, United States

- U.S. National Register of Historic Places
- U.S. Historic district
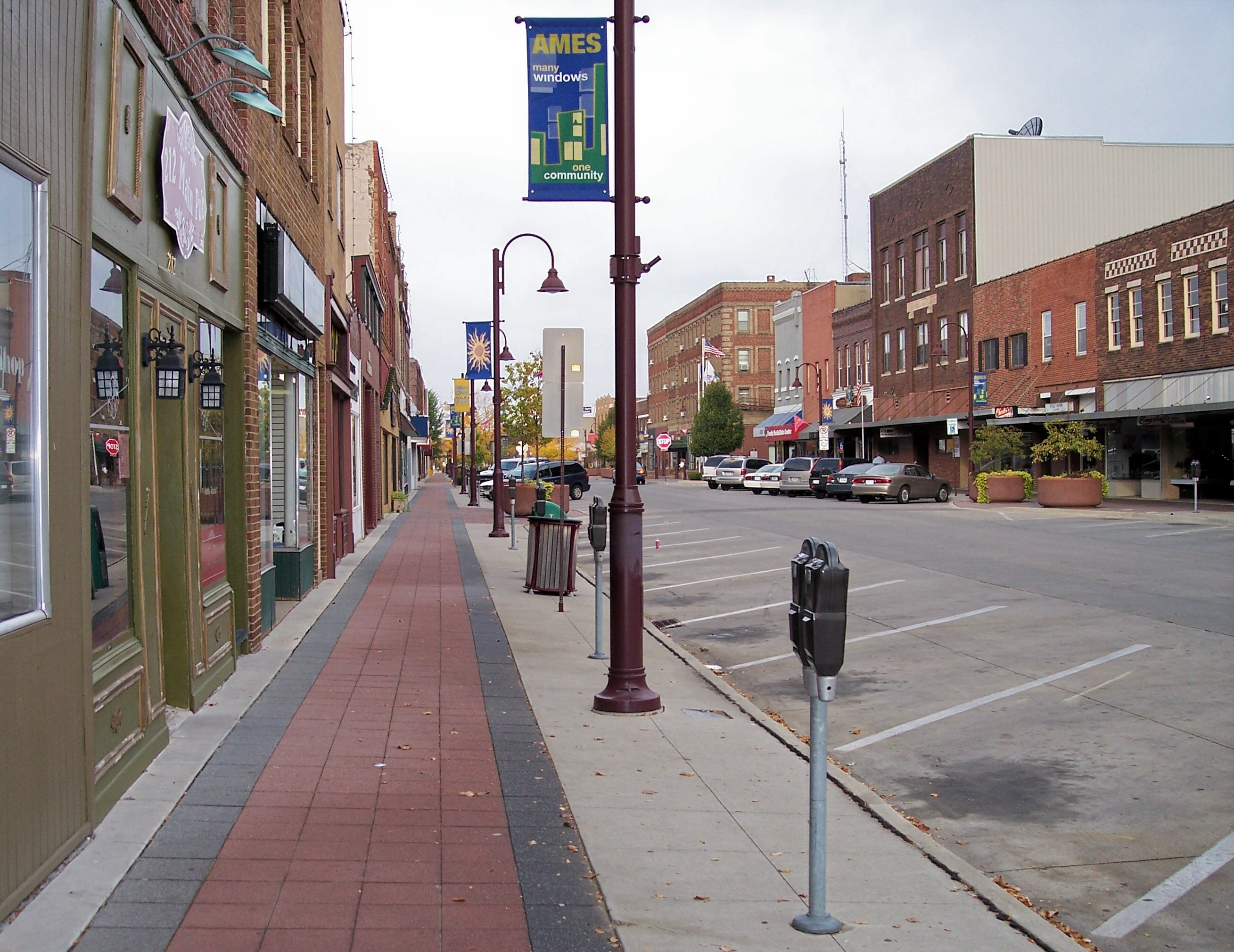

- Location within Iowa Location within the United States
- Location: Roughly 100-400 blocks of Main & 5th Sts. with cross streets of Burnett, Kellogg, Douglas & Duff Sts., Ames, Iowa
- Coordinates: 42°01′32″N 93°36′49″W
- Area: 17.5 acres (7.1 ha)
- Architectural style: Late 19th and Early 20th Century American Movements
- NRHP reference No.: 100002399
- Added to NRHP: May 10, 2018

Ames Main Street Historic District is a nationally recognized historic district located in Ames, Iowa, United States. It was listed on the National Register of Historic Places in 2018. At the time of its nomination it included 81 resources (of which 76 were contributing buildings) as well as 15 non-contributing buildings. The district covers most of the city's central business district. The area began to develop after the Civil War along the Chicago and North Western (CNW) tracks. The district was also served by the Ames & College Railway and its successor, the Fort Dodge, Des Moines, & Southern Interurban Streetcar line, from 1891 to 1929. The later connected downtown Ames and the CNW depot with Iowa State College, now known as Iowa State University.

Most of the buildings in the district are two stories in height and constructed in brick. There are also several single-story structures and a few that rise to three stories. The facades and storefronts run continuously along the blocks with only two breaks for vacant lots that have been transformed into public park plazas. The facades of the commercial buildings in downtown Ames were radically rehabilitated from the late 1910s and into the 1960s, giving them a more modern appearance. While other communities in the state also saw updates to the buildings in their main commercial areas, the difference here is that it was "nearly universal and helped the central business district retain a unified feeling of design." The Municipal Building (1916) and the Masonic Temple (1917) are individually listed on the National Register of Historic Places.

In 2017, the London Underground's building, at 212 Main Street in the district, was to be renovated using grant funding.
