= Briggs Terrace =

- U.S. National Register of Historic Places
- U.S. Historic district
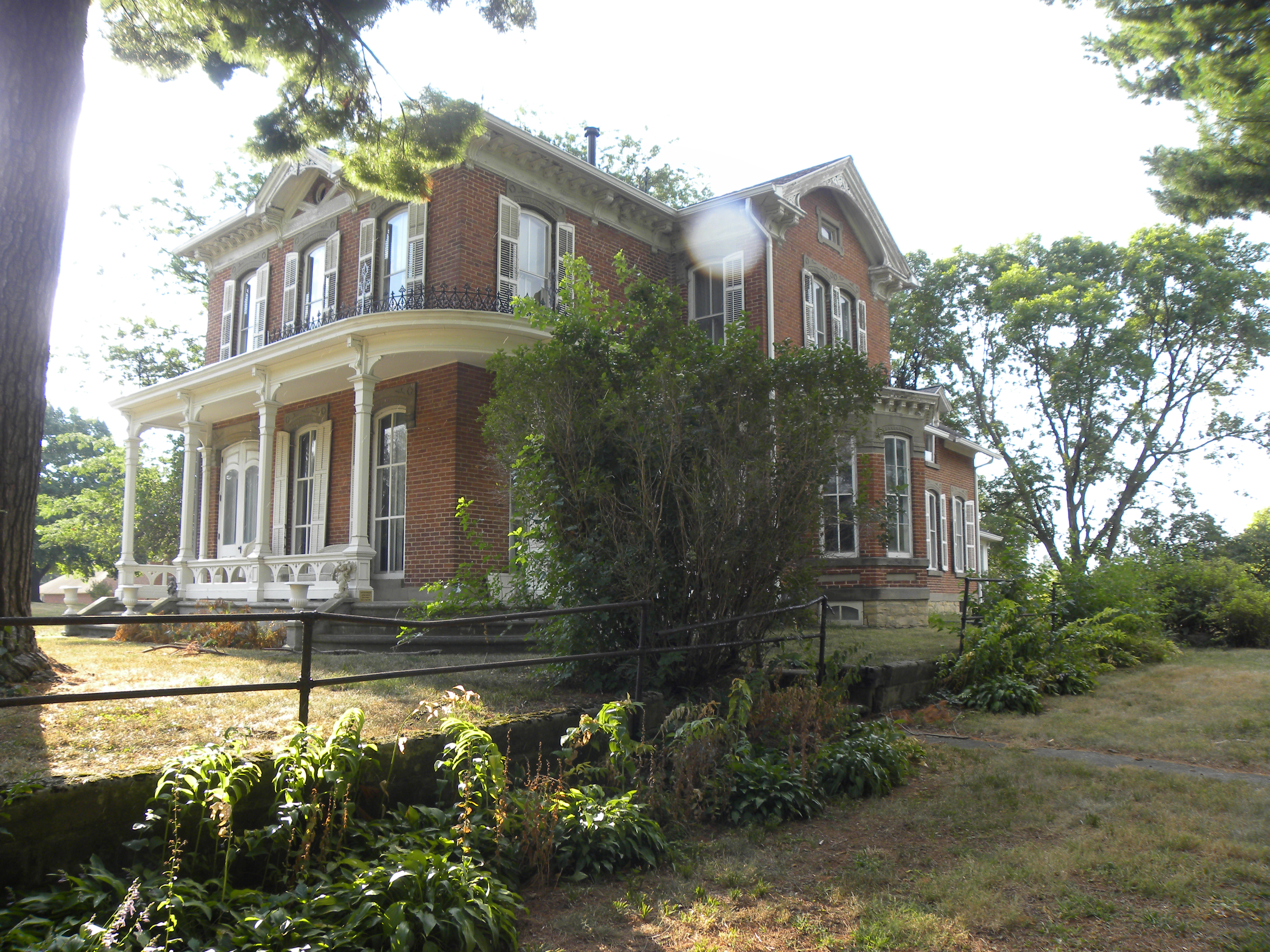

- Location within Iowa Location within the United States
- Location: 1204 H Ave. Nevada, Iowa
- Coordinates: 42°01′06.3″N 93°26′36.4″W
- Area: 8.4 acres (3.4 ha)
- Built: 1879
- Architectural style: Italianate
- NRHP reference No.: 98000868
- Added to NRHP: July 20, 1998

Briggs Terrace, also known as Evergreen Lane, is a nationally recognized historic district located in Nevada, Iowa, United States.

== History ==
Briggs Terrace was listed on the National Register of Historic Places in 1998. At the time of its nomination it consisted of eight resources, which included six contributing buildings, one contributing site, and two non-contributing buildings. This estate was established and built by Otis Briggs, a local banker who founded Farmers Bank in Nevada. He arrived in town in 1857 from Des Moines, four years after Nevada and Story County were founded. He worked in a variety of commercial ventures before becoming a banker. Briggs invested heavily in real estate, and he became one of the largest land owners in the county.

The two-story, brick, Italianate style house was completed in 1879. It features floor-length windows, a wraparound porch, and a bay window. It is surrounded by an 8.4-acre (3.4 ha) planted grounds, which contribute to the historic nature of the district. The other historic building located here are the carriage house (c. 1879), pig barn (c. 1879), and late 19th century out buildings.

=== Halley School 7 ===
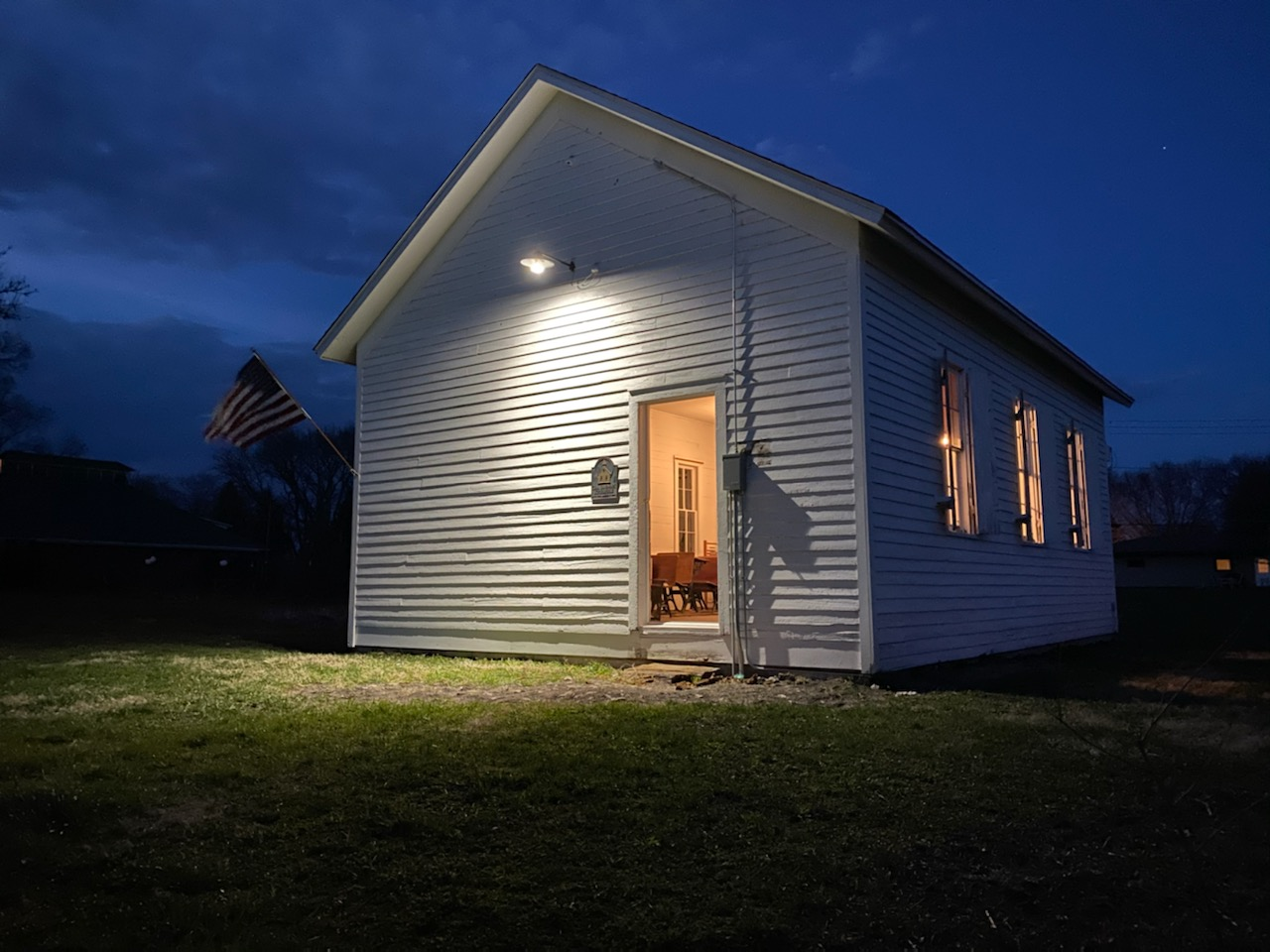
Halley School built 1874

Halley School #7 was built in 1874, and was one of eight schools serving the nearby townships. It was used through the 1944–45 school year, before being sold to private owners.

In 1975, Halley School was given to the Nevada Bicentennial Committee by Ivan and Sally Hornbacher Hansen, Dee Earl, and Lois Hornbacher, in memory of their parents, Issac and Elma Hornbacher. The school was first moved from its original location 6 miles south east of Nevada, Iowa, to the Story County Fair grounds in 1976 to be fully restored in celebration of the United States Bicentennial. It was moved again in 2006 from the county fairgrounds, to a new location on the Briggs Terrace property.
