= William Kennison Wood House =

Historic house in Iowa, United States

- U.S. National Register of Historic Places
- Location within Iowa Location within the United States
- Location: Off County Road S27
- Nearest city: Iowa Center, Iowa
- Coordinates: 41°55′15″N 93°24′22″W
- Area: less than one acre
- Built: 1865
- Architectural style: Italianate
- NRHP reference No.: 95000622
- Added to NRHP: June 5, 1995

The William Kennison Wood House is a historic building located in Story County, Iowa, United States near the unincorporated community of Iowa Center. An Ohio native, Wood settled on this property in 1851 from Polk County, Iowa. He was a squatter here for two years before the county was organized. Wood was a farmer and livestock producer, and became one of the largest landholders in the county. He also served in the Iowa General Assembly from 1869 to 1873. Wood married four times, and was widowed three times. He lived here until his death in 1917. This two-story frame Italianate house was built in three sections. The last section of the house was the family room on the south side of the house in 1991, which replaced the original summer kitchen. The house was listed on the National Register of Historic Places in 1995.
