= Prof. J. L. Budd, Sarah M., and Etta Budd House =

Historic house in Iowa, United States

- U.S. National Register of Historic Places
- U.S. Historic district – Contributing property
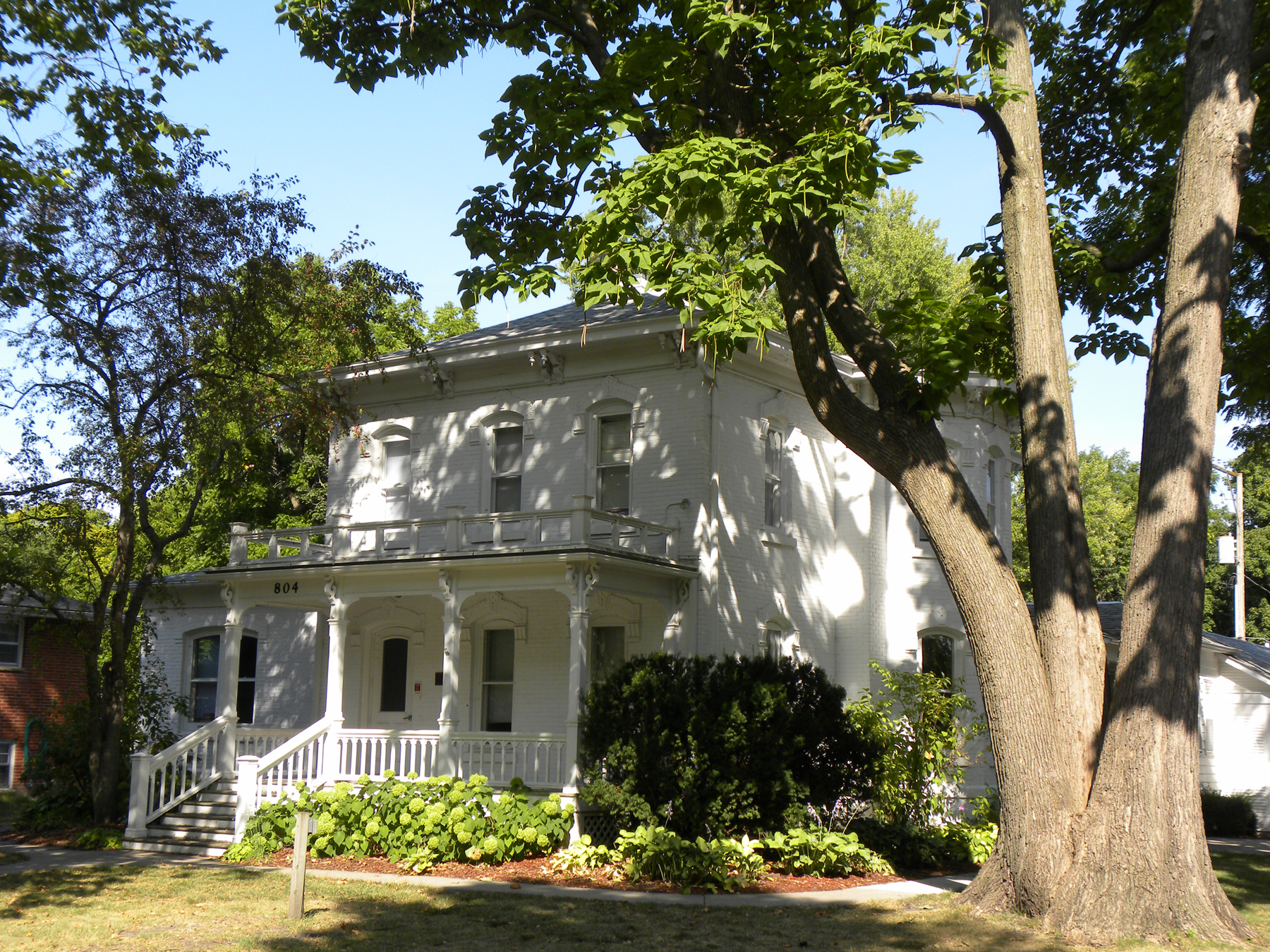

- Location within Iowa Location within the United States
- Location: 804 Kellogg Ave. Ames, Iowa
- Coordinates: 42°1′45.318″N 93°36′48.2796″W
- Area: less than one acre
- Built: 1885
- Architectural style: Italianate
- Part of: Old Town Historic District (ID03001349)
- NRHP reference No.: 01000860
- Added to NRHP: August 8, 2001

The Prof. J. L. Budd, Sarah M., and Etta Budd House, also known as the Youth Recovery House, is a historic building located in Ames, Iowa, United States. It was built as a single family residence in 1885. The two-story brick structure was built using Italianate elements. After World War II it was converted into an apartment building, and later into institutional housing. The attached 1½-story Colonial Revival cottage was moved onto the property in 1963, and used for office space. The house is named for Joseph Lancaster Budd, a botanist at what is now Iowa State University, who helped establish the school's national reputation in horticulture. Sarah was his wife, and Etta was their daughter. She was an artist who was influential in bringing George Washington Carver to Iowa State College for his undergraduate education. Carver resided here briefly in 1891. The house was individually listed on the National Register of Historic Places in 2001, and it was included as a contributing property in the Old Town Historic District in 2004.
