= SGOTUS =

SGOTUS may refer to:

- Second Gentleman of the United States
- Solicitor General of the United States
- Surgeon General of the United States
