= Grace Coolidge =

First Lady of the United States from 1923 to 1929

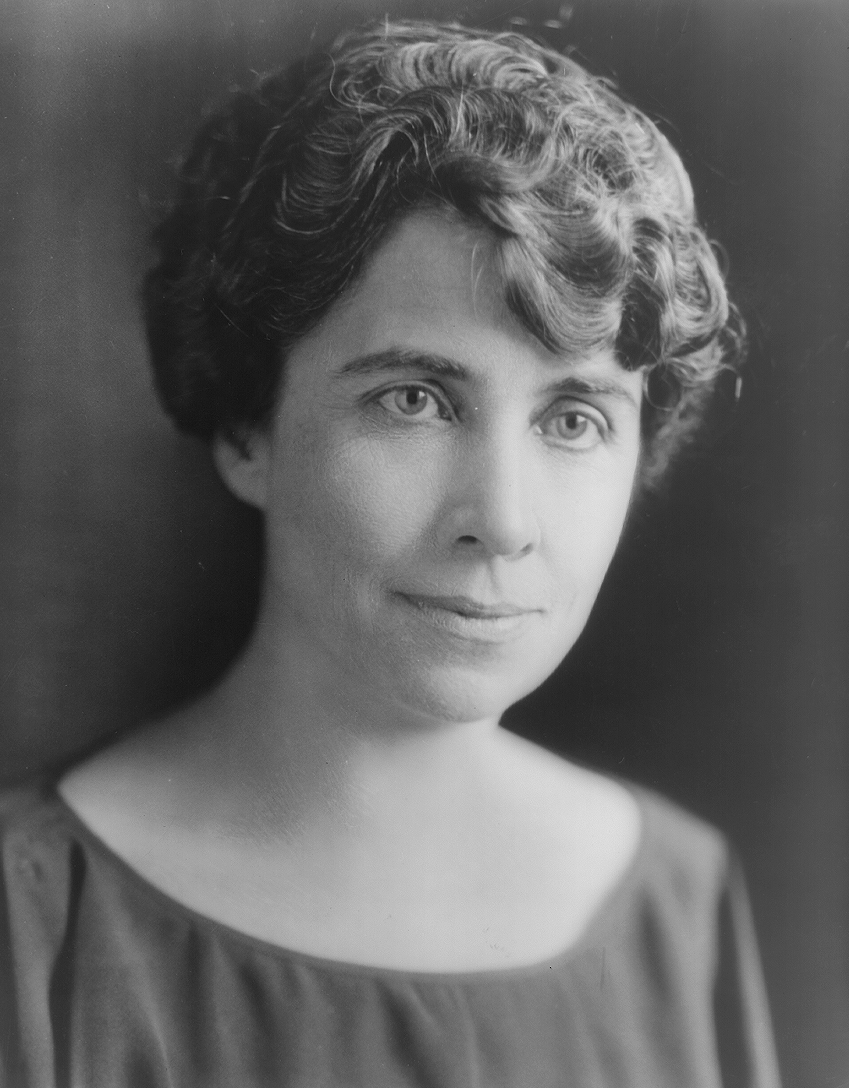
- Coolidge in 1924

First Lady of the United States
- In role August 2, 1923 – March 4, 1929
- President: Calvin Coolidge
- Preceded by: Florence Harding
- Succeeded by: Lou Hoover

Second Lady of the United States
- In role March 4, 1921 – August 2, 1923
- Vice President: Calvin Coolidge
- Preceded by: Lois Marshall
- Succeeded by: Caro Dawes

First Lady of Massachusetts
- In role January 2, 1919 – January 6, 1921
- Governor: Calvin Coolidge
- Preceded by: Ella McCall
- Succeeded by: Mary Cox

Second Lady of Massachusetts
- In role January 6, 1916 – January 2, 1919
- Lieutenant Governor: Calvin Coolidge
- Preceded by: Beatrice Barry (1915)
- Succeeded by: Mary Cox

First Lady of Northampton
- In role January 3, 1910 – January 1, 1912
- Mayor: Calvin Coolidge
- Preceded by: Margaret O'Brien
- Succeeded by: Catherine Feiker

Personal details
- Born: Grace Anna Goodhue; January 3, 1879 Burlington, Vermont, U.S.
- Died: July 8, 1957 (aged 78) Northampton, Massachusetts, U.S.
- Resting place: Plymouth Notch Cemetery
- Party: Republican
- Spouse: Calvin Coolidge (m. 1905; died 1933)
- Children: 2, including John
- Education: University of Vermont

Grace Anna Coolidge (née Goodhue; January 3, 1879 – July 8, 1957) was first lady of the United States from 1923 to 1929 as the wife of the 30th president of the United States, Calvin Coolidge. She was previously the second lady of the United States from 1921 to 1923 and the first lady of Massachusetts from 1919 to 1921.

Coolidge was born and raised in Burlington, Vermont, and attended the University of Vermont where she co-founded the school's chapter of Pi Beta Phi. She moved to Northampton, Massachusetts, to teach at Clarke School for the Deaf. She met Calvin Coolidge in Northampton, and they married in 1905. They had two sons. She stayed in Northampton to raise their children while her husband's political career progressed in Boston. The family moved to Washington, D.C. when Coolidge was elected vice president in 1921, and into the White House after the death of Warren G. Harding, in 1923.

Coolidge was active as first lady, hosting thousands of guests each year, and she made regular public appearances in the President's stead. She was popular and highly regarded for her ability to charm visitors. Her fashion choices were influential among American women as she wore a variety of hats and chose modest versions of contemporary designs. Coolidge distanced herself from the politically active first ladies who preceded her, though she quietly took interest in helping women's groups and the deaf. She felt restricted by the role of first lady; she believed that it took priority over her own interests, and she was subject to many rules imposed on her by her husband. She was much affected by the death of her younger son in 1924, though she interrupted her duties as the White House hostess only for a few weeks. In the final year of her tenure, Coolidge was afflicted with a kidney disease which left her temporarily debilitated.

The Coolidges returned to Northampton in 1929, where Coolidge began publishing poetry and autobiographical essays. Following her husband's death in 1933, she became more independent and began traveling. Coolidge was an advocate of American involvement in World War II, and she lent her house to WAVES when the U.S. entered the war. She remained active on the board of Clarke School and in programs for the deaf until her death in 1957.

== Early life ==
=== Childhood ===
Grace Anna Goodhue was born in Burlington, Vermont, on January 3, 1879, the only child of Andrew Issachar Goodhue and Lemira Barrett Goodhue. She was part of the family that was descended from the 1635 colonist William Goodhue and congressman Benjamin Goodhue. Each summer, she joined a family reunion in Hancock, New Hampshire, until 1899 when the last of the Goodhue grandparents died. She also visited her maternal grandfather in the summers where she listened to his stories of the Civil War. Goodhue was close to her mother as a child, following her where she went and taking up the same household chores such as sewing.

Goodhue's father was a milling engineer, and the family rented a house from his employer. In the early 1880s, her father built them a new home near the mill at 123 Maple Street, installing several desirable features: a bathtub of tin and wood, a furnace that heated the entire home, and electric lights. With the exception of a spinal problem that was treated through exercise, Goodhue faced little adversity during her childhood. When her father was injured in a work accident in 1886, she stayed with their neighbors, the Yale family. Here she bonded with their adult daughter, June Yale. June began teaching at the Clarke School for the Deaf in Northampton, Massachusetts, and sometimes brought students to Vermont in the summers. By her teenage years, Goodhue was helping June care for them.

Goodhue's father left the mill after his accident and co-founded a machine shop. He was a Democrat, and with this experience he was appointed by Democratic President Grover Cleveland as a steamboat inspector later in 1886. This brought money and status to the family in their small town. Goodhue had a deeply religious upbringing, raised on Puritan values and spending most of the family's social outings at church events. The family was Methodist until she was a teenager, when she convinced them to convert to Congregationalism. Her father built a new home for the family at 312 Maple Street in 1899.

=== Education ===
Goodhue attended Burlington High School, where she studied Latin and French. She also received private lessons in piano, speech, and singing. She spoke at her school's commencement in 1897, delivering a speech she titled "Tramp Instinct". She enrolled at the University of Vermont in 1897, then dropped out that November because of an eye condition and returned the following year. She took little interest in her studies. Instead, Goodhue was involved with several activities in and out of the university, including dance, skating, tobogganing, sleighing, theater, Bible class, Christian Endeavor, and poetry. She also joined the glee club where she performed as a contralto, and she became her class's vice president in her second year. Goodhue gained a reputation for being likeable and outgoing, and she was courted by several men over the course of her schooling. Her most serious relationship was with a man named Frank Joyner. Despite her family's reservations about Joyner, the two had an informal agreement that they would wed. Although the prevailing opinion at the time that rotundness was an attractive trait, Goodhue was insecure about her weight and restricted her diet.

Noticing a lonely-looking woman on the University of Vermont campus, Goodhue befriended Ivah Gale. Gale eventually moved into the Goodhue home where she shared a bedroom with Goodhue, and they were among those who co-founded the university's chapter of Pi Beta Phi, a women's fraternity. The group held its meetings in Goodhue's home. In 1901, Goodhue traveled to Syracuse, New York, to attend the fraternity's national convention. She graduated from the University of Vermont in 1902, and decided to teach at Clarke School for the Deaf. She wrote to the school's principal, June Yale's aunt Caroline Yale, about training as an instructor for the deaf. Goodhue moved to Northampton where she taught at the school for three years, first instructing the primary school children before working with middle school students. Her mother opposed the decision, wishing that she would be a teacher at a local school. The Clarke School's policy was to teach lip reading rather than sign language, which Goodhue agreed was beneficial for the students as it allowed them to participate in society.

== Marriage and family ==
Goodhue met Calvin Coolidge in her second year in Northampton. While watering flowers outside of the dormitory, she first saw the young man through a window across from the school, where he was shaving wearing only long underwear and a derby hat. He heard her laugh, and he subsequently asked his landlord, the school's steward Robert Weir, to introduce them. Weir set them up to both appear at a mutual friend's house. Joking about her suitor's reserved nature, he commented that if Goodhue could teach the deaf to hear, then she could perhaps teach the mute to speak. They began a relationship; Goodhue had kept in touch with her previous suitor, Frank Joyner, but she had ended the relationship with him.

Calvin Coolidge was active in politics and took her to a Republican Party event at city hall for their first date. From then on, he could be found accompanying her to all of her picnics and dances, though he did not participate. He attempted to ice skate with her once and decided they would go home when he was unsuccessful. To those around them, their relationship was defined by their contrasting personalities, as he was quiet and reserved as opposed to her more outgoing demeanor. Despite this, they bonded over several shared qualities: their background as college-educated Vermonters, mischievous senses of humor, work ethic, religious sensibilities, and feelings of idealism and public service. The two frequently exchanged playful remarks targeting one another, often focused on her cooking and his quietude, respectively. He welcomed her nasally impression of him. She got along well with his family and had their approval. Although Goodhue had been raised as a Democrat, she switched to the Republican Party. She also had her friend Ivah Gale take a three-hour buggy ride with him, so she could form her own opinion of the man. He said nothing during the trip, but Gale wanted the couple to stay together and said she had got along well with him.

The first time Goodhue's parents met their daughter's suitor, he asked permission to marry her. He proposed to Goodhue in 1905 by telling her "I am going to be married to you". Goodhue's mother was not fond of him and sought to delay the wedding, but he insisted on a date no later than October. The couple married in the parlor of the Goodhue family's home on October 4, 1905, with fifteen guests in attendance. Calvin and Grace Coolidge took a short honeymoon in Montreal, but time was limited as he had to return to Northampton to run as a candidate for the school board—he was defeated. They first lived in the Norwood Hotel for three weeks before staying in a house owned by a professor at Smith College. They moved to their long-term home at 21 Massasoit Street in 1906. The Coolidges had very little money in these early years of their marriage, but she was often the recipient of desirable clothes and hats as gifts from her husband. She otherwise made her own clothes. When the Norwood Hotel closed, they purchased some of its branded linen and silverware for their own use.

The couple had two sons: John Coolidge on September 7, 1906, and Calvin Coolidge Jr. on April 13, 1908. It took them a long time to name their younger son, and they initially called him Bunny because he was born around Easter. Calvin Coolidge was elected to the Massachusetts legislature shortly after their first son was born, so he spent much of his time in the state capital, Boston. They felt it was important not to let his career be a burden on the children, so the rest of the family stayed in Northampton and he returned home on the weekends. Even when he was home, he had his wife address the needs of their children. She engaged in activities with them, teaching them baseball and constructing wooden cars for them to ride in. She came to love baseball and was a fan of the sport for the rest of her life. She had little involvement in her husband's professional life and made no attempt to be present for it after one instance when he asked her not to attend a speech he gave at their church.

Coolidge's husband left the state legislature in 1909 and became mayor of Northampton the following year, taking a job that let him return to his family each night. He was elected to the state legislature again in 1911 and went back to Boston. Coolidge was a regular participant in church activities while her husband was away and attended card parties with her friends, where she sewed while the others played. She visited Washington, D.C., for the first time in 1912 when she chaperoned a trip for students of Northampton High School. She is quoted as saying that she would one day return to the White House to play its piano, after a guard rebutted her attempt to do so. Her younger son was diagnosed with emphysema the following year, necessitating an operation.

== Entering political life ==
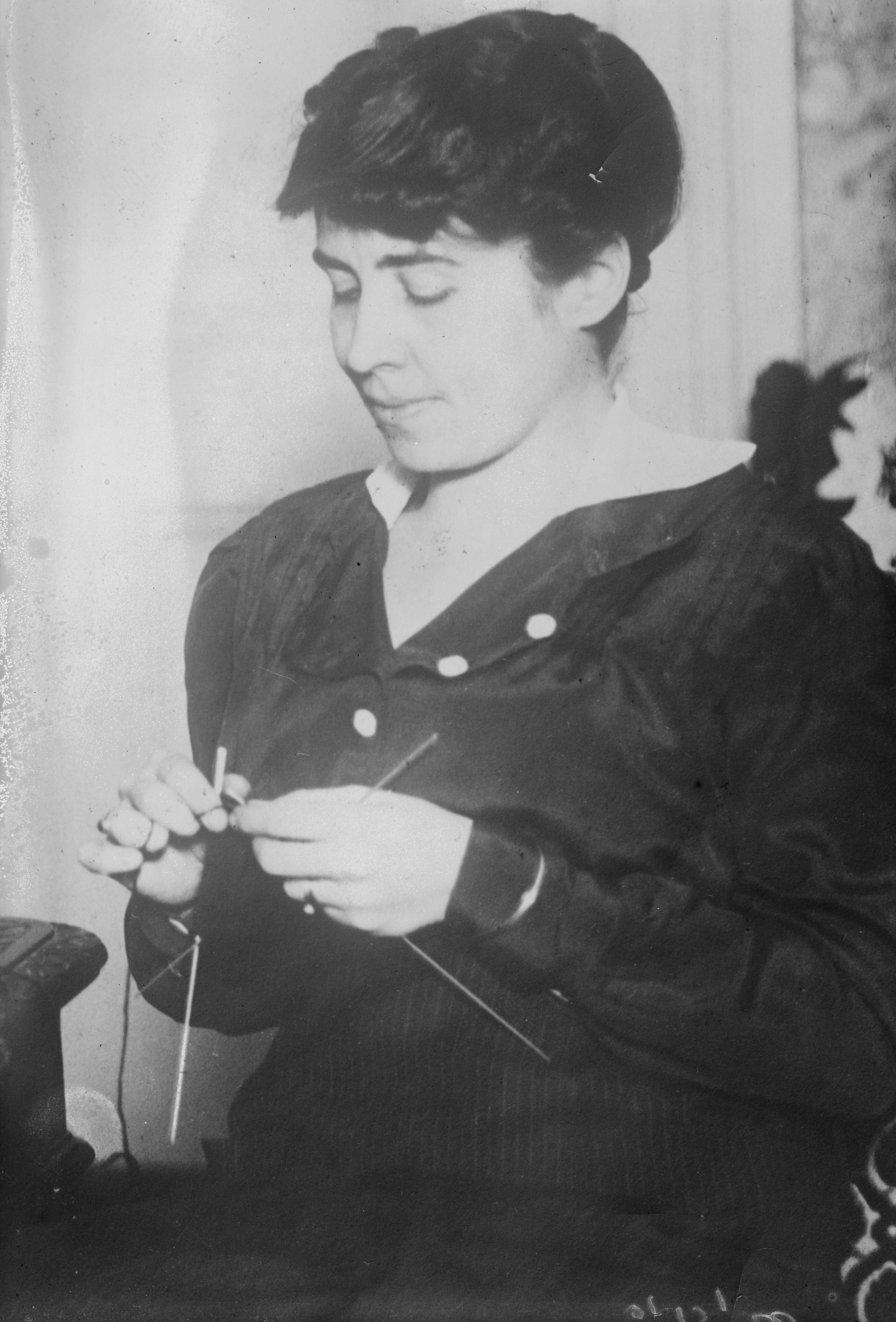
Coolidge in 1915

Coolidge ascended in her own political career within the ranks of Pi Beta Phi. She became president of the Western Massachusetts Alumnae Club in 1910, vice president of the fraternity's Alpha Province covering the entire East Coast in 1912, and president of the Alpha Province in 1915. She went on a tour of California for Pi Beta Phi that year, but her trip ended early when she received a telegram informing her that her husband was a candidate to be lieutenant governor of Massachusetts. Her return home was delayed when her mother fell ill and Coolidge went to see her in Burlington.

Coolidge's husband was inaugurated as lieutenant governor on January 6, 1916. That same year, the couple joined his political ally Frank Stearns and his wife Emily Clark Stearns on a trip to Washington D.C. The Coolidges took on a housekeeper, Alice Reckahn, who stayed with them for decades. When World War I began, Coolidge worked with the other women in the community to conduct bond drives and support Red Cross, where she became co-chair of the Women's War Committee of Northampton.

After three years as lieutenant governor, Coolidge's husband was elected governor of Massachusetts in 1918. She led the march at his inaugural ball. Despite being the governor's wife, Coolidge refused to move to Boston full time, choosing to stay with her sons in Northampton, which caused some displeasure in the state. She instead made periodic trips to the city. While staying in Boston, Coolidge joined her husband in his cramped room at the Adams House Hotel on Washington Street, which was expanded to two rooms so she could host guests. She was responsible for entertaining in the capital at times and became popular among guests despite her lack of experience as a hostess. Coolidge's husband had little time for her while he was governor, rarely visiting her in Northampton and sometimes having a staff member accompany her on his behalf during her visits to Boston.

Coolidge supported her husband's decision to accept the Republican Party's nomination to be vice president of the United States in 1920 as the running mate of Warren G. Harding, though she also felt that he should accept nothing short of the presidential nomination. The Republican ticket won, and Calvin Coolidge became vice president in 1921. Coolidge moved to Washington D.C. with him and enrolled their sons in boarding school at Mercersburg Academy. They moved into a suite on the top floor of the Willard Hotel.

== Second lady of the United States ==
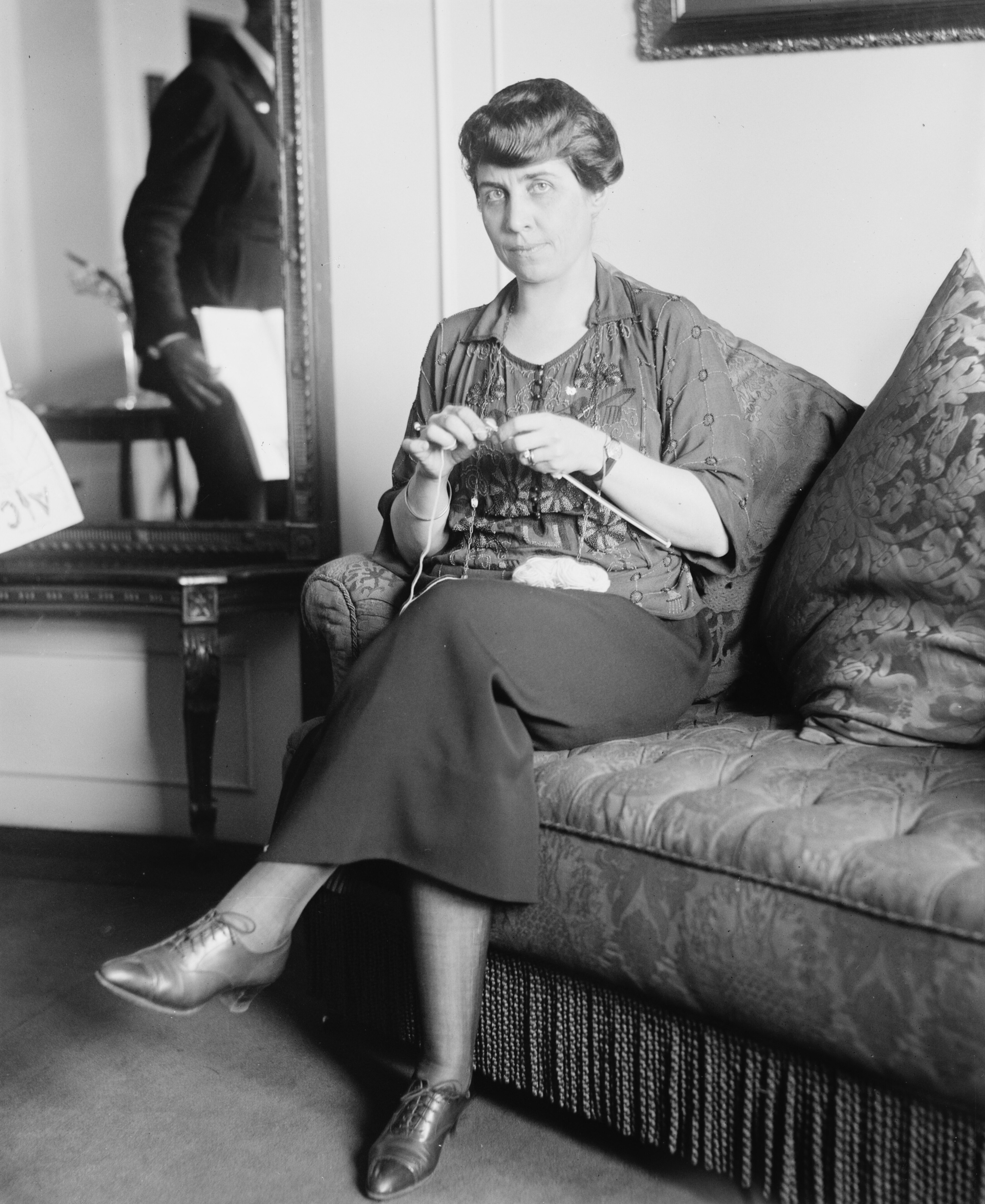
Coolidge in 1921

Being second lady of the United States brought Coolidge a larger national profile. She appeared at ceremonial events with her husband, and her entertaining duties became much greater than they had been when she was the wife of a governor. Coolidge received guests at her home each week, sometimes in numbers well beyond her capacity to address them all. She also made weekly calls to the wives of many important figures in Washington. To alleviate her responsibilities, she hired a part-time secretary, and her husband made a point of setting deadlines for their attendance at events so they could end their day early.

Lois Irene Marshall and Emily Clark Stearns, the previous second lady and the wife of her husband's political ally, respectively, both became mentors for Coolidge as she acclimated to her new role. On her first night as second lady, Coolidge dined with the celebrated general John J. Pershing and the two bonded over their experiences as parents. Coolidge was president of the Senate Wives Club as second lady, and through this she continued her activity supporting the Red Cross. She also took dancing classes, though her husband asked that she not be seen dancing in public and risk controversy. Her attendance at the dedication of the Tomb of the Unknown Soldier left an impression on her in 1921.

The Hardings were not fond of the Coolidges. The first lady, Florence Harding, resented Grace Coolidge's youth and popularity. Coolidge became responsible for Florence's hosting duties for a period of time in late 1922, after the first lady fell ill with life-threatening nephritis. The Coolidges were at the vice president's family home in Vermont when they received news that President Harding had died suddenly. Coolidge wept upon hearing the news and then prayed alongside her husband. She became first lady of the United States on August 2, 1923.

== First lady of the United States ==
=== White House hostess ===
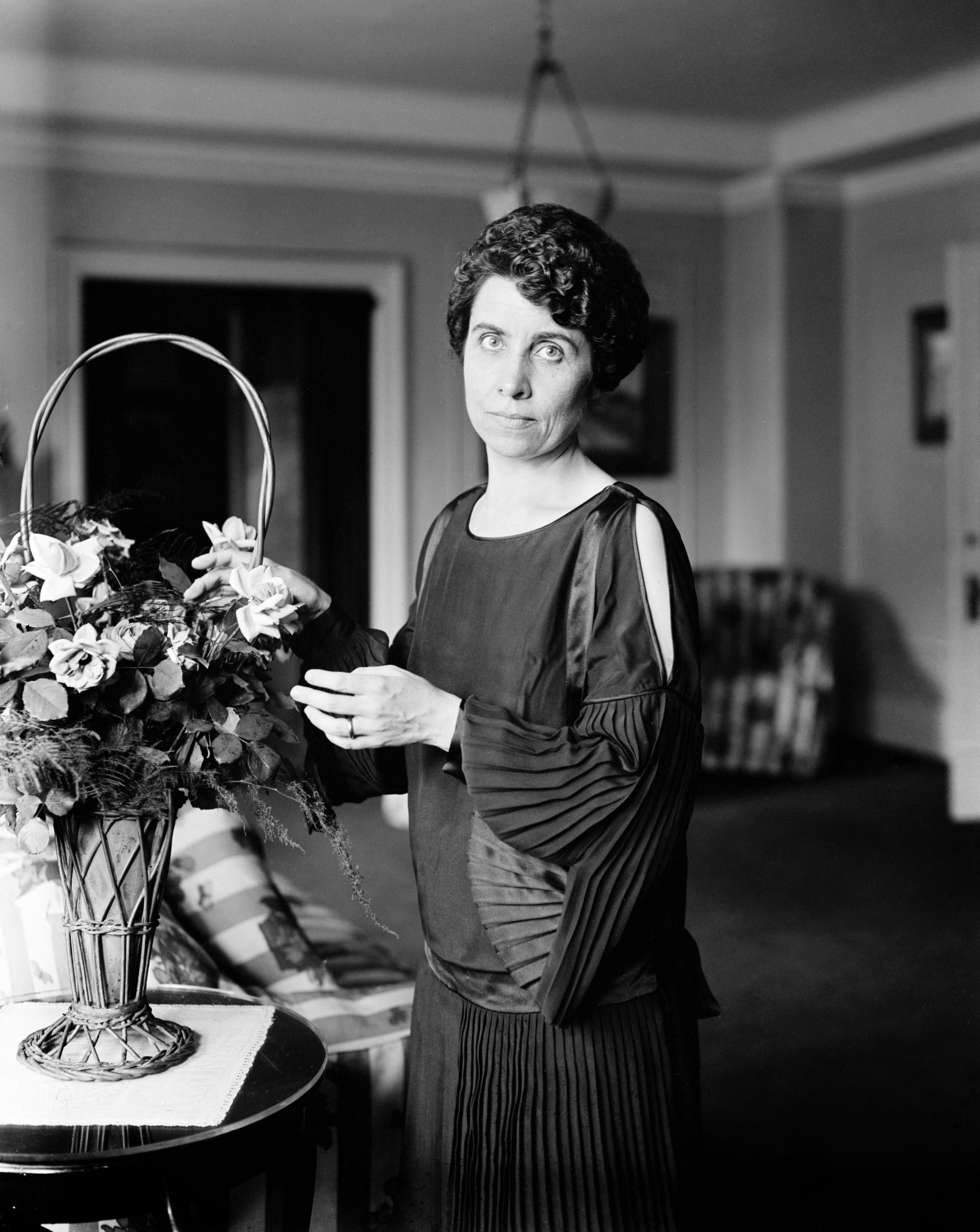
Coolidge in 1923

The Coolidges were one of the most socially active families in the history of White House. Her public receptions brought a total of 20,000 to 25,000 people to the White House annually. In addition to her normal hosting duties, she held exclusive high teas in the Red Room that replaced the brief one-on-one meetings Florence Harding had with guests—Coolidge felt that these meetings excluded too many people. She believed that as first lady, she should invite as many guests as possible so everyone had an opportunity to meet with her. Coolidge was responsible for a large staff, including eighteen servants, a valet, a maid, and other cleaning staff. They affectionately referred to her as "Sunshine". Besides hosting, Coolidge's only daily responsibility was to arrange flowers for her bedroom and the West Sitting Hall. Coolidge's husband insisted on organizing White House events and catering, freeing her from a job that was typically expected of the first lady.

Coolidge preferred meeting common people over holding formal events. She especially found joy in her opportunities to work with children, including the White House egg rolling on Easter and on May Day celebrations. For Christmas 1923, she had the First Congregational Church choir and the Marine Band perform Christmas carols, and a new White House tradition was created when she invited spectators to come onto the lawn. She also held small musical events during Lent. She complied with prohibition and refrained from serving alcohol at the White House, though she was unhappy that it caused societal disregard for the law.

Coolidge wrote and received many letters, corresponding with her friends and the public. When she received gifts, she briefly kept them in her bedroom so she could send a truthful reply saying she enjoyed them. She replied to much of her mail personally, though she was assisted by her secretary. Coolidge first worked with the Hardings' secretary Laura Harlan, but she gave the role to White House staff member Mary Randolph after Harlan's departure in 1925. When she fired her housekeeper Elizabeth Jaffray and replaced her with Ellen A. Riley, Jaffray retaliated by publishing a tell all, Secrets of the White House, which gave an unkind depiction of the Coolidges and made misleading claims.

Washington society welcomed Coolidge's unpretentious approach to her role as first lady, and she acted as a comforting presence for guests at receptions. She often saved face for her husband and his curt social behavior by making jokes about it.

Coolidge became first lady amid the Jazz Age and mingled with early celebrities. Her love for music meant that popular musicians were a common sight at the White House, which helped with the public image of the administration. Many of these musicians participated in the president's 1924 reelection campaign. The pianist Sergei Rachmaninoff played for the White House many times and when Al Jolson appeared at the White House, Coolidge sang alongside him. She also hosted popular actors like Douglas Fairbanks and Mary Pickford.

Among Coolidge's more difficult guests was Queen Marie of Romania in October 1926. Known for her overpowering personality and love of media attention, the queen had to be constantly managed. Coolidge bonded with her over their shared experiences as mothers. She took to the queen's son Nicholas, who felt out of place at the event until she had him sit with her at dinner. This contrasted with an enjoyable visit from John D. Rockefeller Jr. the next February, where Coolidge customized their menu and had high quality dishware brought in.

=== Public image ===
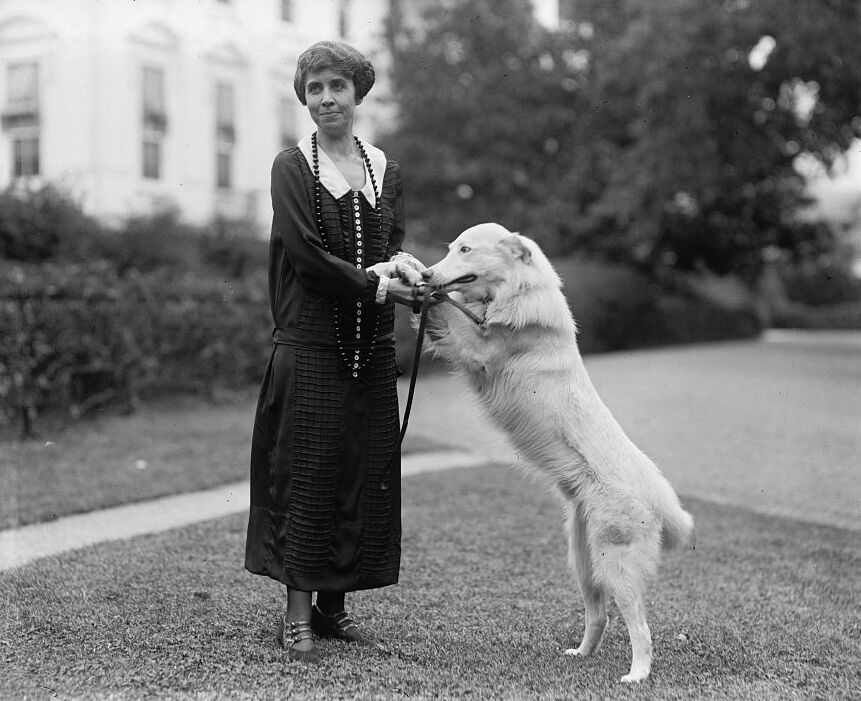
Grace Coolidge and her dog Rob Roy in 1924

Coolidge took on much of the social responsibilities of the president, which her husband saw as a distraction from his work, and she made regular appearances at public events and charity programs. She typically allowed her photo to be taken, leading to frequent appearances in the newspapers. These photos allowed her a level of control over her public image and what she chose to share. On her husband's request, she refused any interviews that were asked of her, and she once responded to a request by making her comments in sign language. She was careful not to speak over radio, despite the attempts of radio technicians to discreetly capture her voice whenever she stood near a microphone at a public event. When they were with company, Coolidge addressed her husband as "Mr. President". The dynamic of Coolidge as lively and her husband as reserved became embedded in the public's image of the couple.

The public primarily learned about the first lady through second-hand stories of her sociable demeanor. She was seen as a domestic figure, defined as a mother and a homemaker. Anecdotes such as her fascination with the 1925 solar eclipse and the Graf Zeppelin helped the public relate to her. She was willing to greet anyone who noticed her in public as she took her walks or went shopping around Washington. When meeting with the public or political figures, she was aided by her ability to remember people's names and facts about their lives. Coolidge became known for her love of sports, and her support for the Washington Senators and the Boston Red Sox earned her the moniker "First Lady of Baseball", and she was devoted to the baseball player Babe Ruth. Her interest in gardening also became known, and the "Mrs. Coolidge rose" was named after her. She was recognized as an avid churchgoer, which helped build an image of her as pious.

Coolidge's visibility as a college-educated woman made her into a symbol for women's opportunities in universities. She was the first of the first ladies to hold a bachelor's degree. She then became the first of the first ladies to receive an honorary degree; she received an honorary LL.D. from Boston University in 1924. She then received an honorary degree from George Washington University alongside her husband in 1929.

While she was first lady, Coolidge was plagued by false rumors, including that she intended to get a divorce or that she was pregnant. The former caused the couple to make more frequent appearances together in public, while the latter prompted many gifts in the form of baby clothes. The Coolidges refused to openly respond to the lies. There were also rumors that Coolidge had become romantically involved with her Secret Service guard Jim Haley or that her husband was jealous of the time they spent together. Years after leaving the White House, she determined that she had successfully avoided doing anything that might be publicly embarrassing.

=== Personal life ===
Coolidge was delighted when she became first lady of the United States, but she soon felt constrained by her role and the expectations that came with it. She described a divide between her true self and her job, saying that her "personal likes and dislikes must be subordinated" to the first ladyship. When she was not tending to her responsibilities, Coolidge spent her days shopping and taking miles-long walks. She kept with her sewing and knitting, making some of her own dresses. She enjoyed the large residential quarters in the White House and decorated it to her liking.

To limit anything potentially controversial, Coolidge's husband strictly controlled her activities. After she received press coverage for going out horse-riding, he instructed her to "not try anything new", and her personal projects were limited to the traditional role of the first lady to work with the Girl Scouts. He also asked her not to smoke in public, a rule which he had also imposed on himself. New constraints on her time also burdened her. She often did not know her own schedule, being told shortly beforehand whether she was to accompany her husband to an event or that he had scheduled an appearance for her. She once complained about not knowing their schedule, but the president rebutted that he could not "give out that information promiscuously". Adding to her stress, the weather in Washington caused problems with her sinuses.

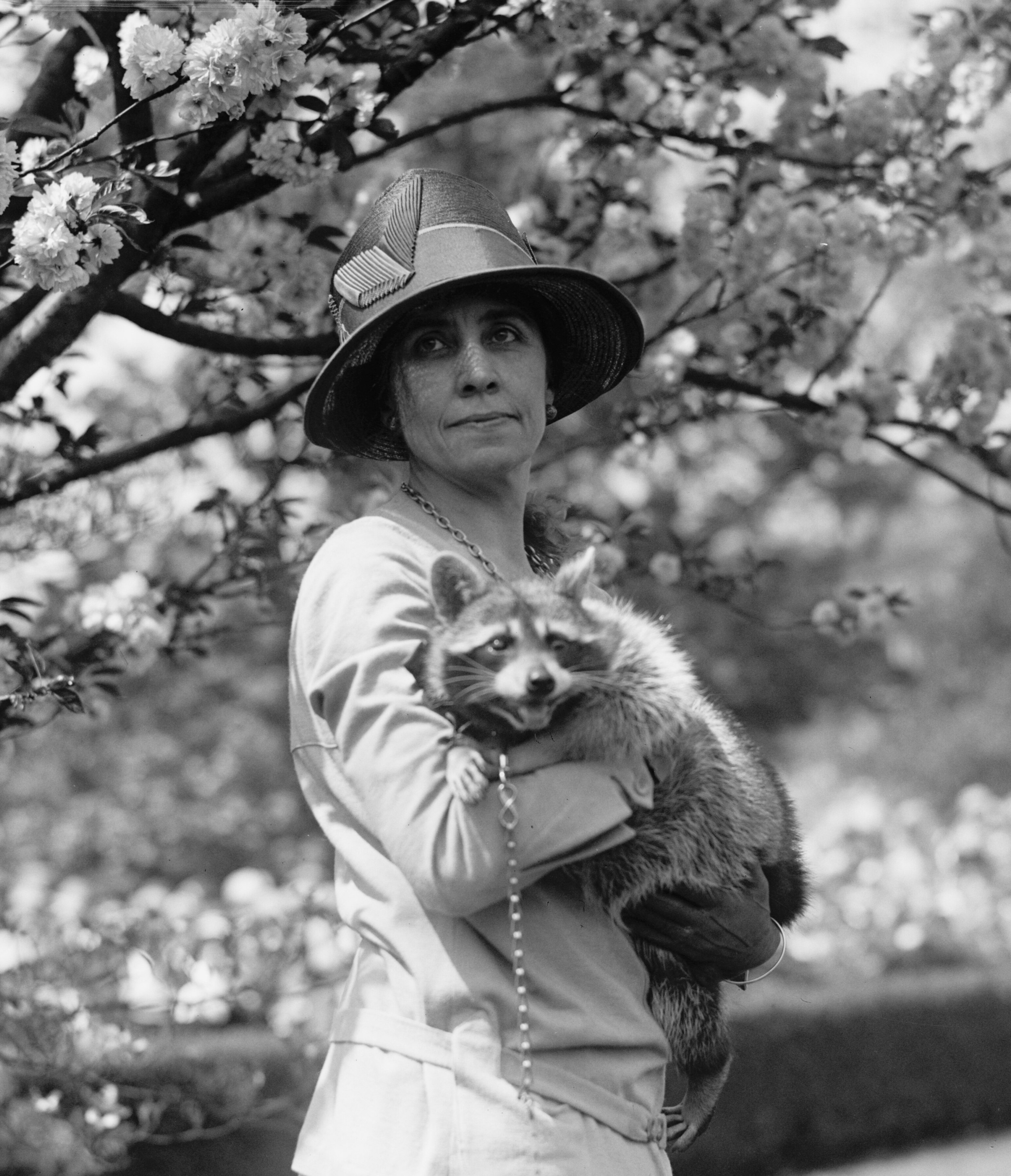
Grace Coolidge and her raccoon Rebecca in 1927

Coolidge had a penchant for animals and used her time in the White House to gather numerous pets, including several dogs and birds. The family's white collies, Rob Roy and Prudence Prim, were the most popular among the public. For her closer friends, she left calling cards on behalf of her dog in addition to her own. Coolidge received several wild animals as gifts and had them sent to live in the zoo, but she kept a raccoon, Rebecca. Despite the Coolidges' adoration for the raccoon, Rebecca wreaked havoc on the White House and scared the staff, and she too was sent to live at the zoo.

The Coolidges always dined with guests or people staying at the White House during afternoon and evening meals, but each morning they ate breakfast privately in their bedroom. Through her role, Grace Coolidge became friends with figures such as Alice Roosevelt Longworth and William Howard Taft. When Longworth discovered she was pregnant, Coolidge was the first person she told outside of her family. The Coolidges spent many of their weekends on the presidential yacht and vacationed in Massachusetts, South Dakota, Vermont, and Wisconsin. They also made occasional trips to attend events in New York City. In 1925, they established a Summer White House in Swampscott, Massachusetts. Coolidge chose the location, then regretted it when her husband was not happy. She enjoyed attending film and theater events, and was a common sight at the National Theatre. In some cases, she sat among the audience instead of in a box. Coolidge was also the first of the first ladies to listen to the radio in the White House. In early 1924, her younger son, Calvin Jr., taught her how to swim. According to Ike Hoover, the White House Chief Usher, Coolidge was the first first lady to try a cigarette.

The Coolidges were devastated by the sudden death of Calvin Jr. at age 16 on July 7, 1924. He developed a blister on his foot while playing tennis a few days before, which caused lethal blood poisoning. Coolidge stopped hosting at the White House for several weeks while she grieved. She became emotionally distant with her husband as neither were comfortable expressing their grief. To ease her pain, she took up poetry and looked to religion. She made a point not to express grief publicly. Each day, she placed one rose in a vase beside Calvin Jr.'s photograph and one on his bed. She invited people they knew to comfort them at the White House, including her father-in-law as well as Alice Longworth with her infant daughter.

Coolidge attended the farewell party for C. Bascom Slemp, her husband's presidential secretary, at the onset of her husband's second term; Slemp requested her presence specifically at the event where there were otherwise no women. She maintained her close relationship with her father-in-law until his death in March 1926, and her letters about the family's goings on brought him comfort toward the end of his life. Her son John became quite popular and frequently received invitations to parties by early 1927 when he was out of school for the winter, but she restricted his activities knowing that these events could go until 5:00 a.m.

=== Political activity ===
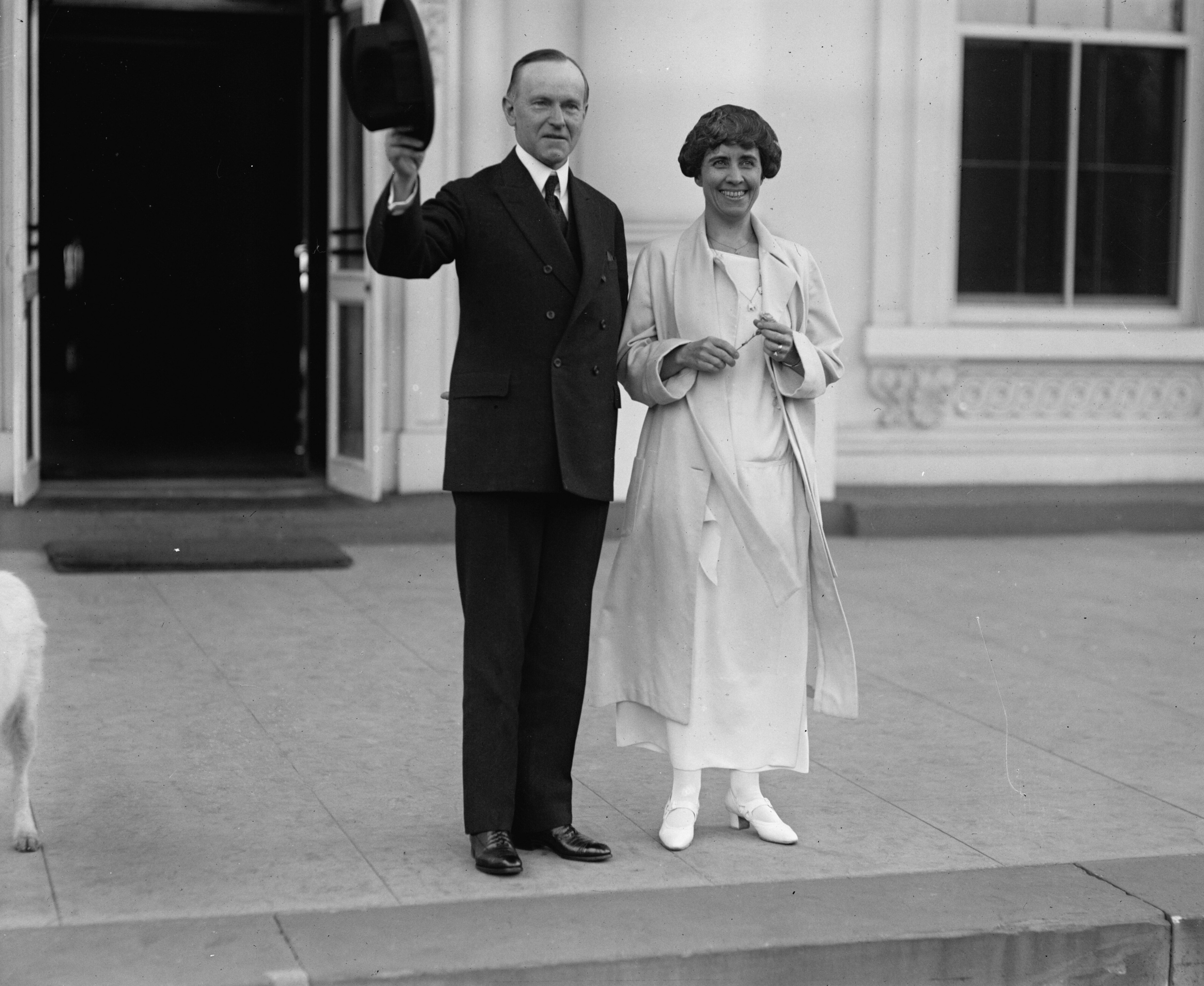
Calvin and Grace Coolidge in 1924

Coolidge kept away from politics and is not seen as having influenced her husband's political positions. She followed his request that she not express opinions publicly or speak to the press. Her silence on political issues put the public at ease as she followed the more active first ladies Florence Harding, Edith Wilson, and Helen Herron Taft. She wrote only one formal publication during her tenure—an article on knitting for which the Home for Needy Confederate Women received a donation of $250.

Although Coolidge's popularity benefited her husband's reelection campaign, she had minimal participation leading up to the 1924 presidential election as she was still grieving the death of her son. Her only solo campaign appearance was at the Montgomery County Maryland Women's Republic Club, where she sat in the audience on September 19. She filled in her absentee ballot in front of the press on the White House lawn to encourage women to vote.

Despite her silence around politics, Coolidge subtly paid attention to current events by sitting in on budget meetings and attending Senate hearings regarding the Teapot Dome scandal. She took interest in the government's involvement in the arts and got to know the chairman of the Commission of Fine Arts, Charles Moore. When General Pershing brought a design for a war memorial to the president, she informed the general that it looked too much like a guillotine and that it should be returned to the architect for a different design. She also took interest in the passing of the Public Buildings Act of 1926. Coolidge once used her position to influence the Veterans' Bureau; when she discovered that her maid's son had breathing problems from a gas attack in World War I, she had the bureau relocate him to the Western United States where clearer air would help his recovery.

Coolidge was most active in children's welfare and support for the deaf. She often invited deaf people, including students from Clarke School, to visit the White House. Helen Keller was a frequent guest. The Coolidges did not engage in any outward advocacy for the cause of deaf children to avoid the appearance of favoring it, especially since both held board positions for groups supporting the deaf. The financial editor Clarence W. Barron encouraged the couple to hold a fundraiser for Clarke School in 1928. Without fanfare, Coolidge raised the most funds any first lady ever had for a cause, over $2 million, for the school. Coolidge similarly invited women's groups to the White House as she privately supported women's causes, and she ensured that the wives of cabinet members were seated as a distinct group during her husband's first address to Congress. She privately supported the idea of a working woman, even if she preferred domestic life for herself. She opposed the more radical aspects of the contemporary feminist movement such as the actions of Alice Paul. Publicly, Coolidge was more likely to speak about religion, believing that it was an essential part of American society. She was also an advocate for the Red Cross.

=== Renovation and vacation ===
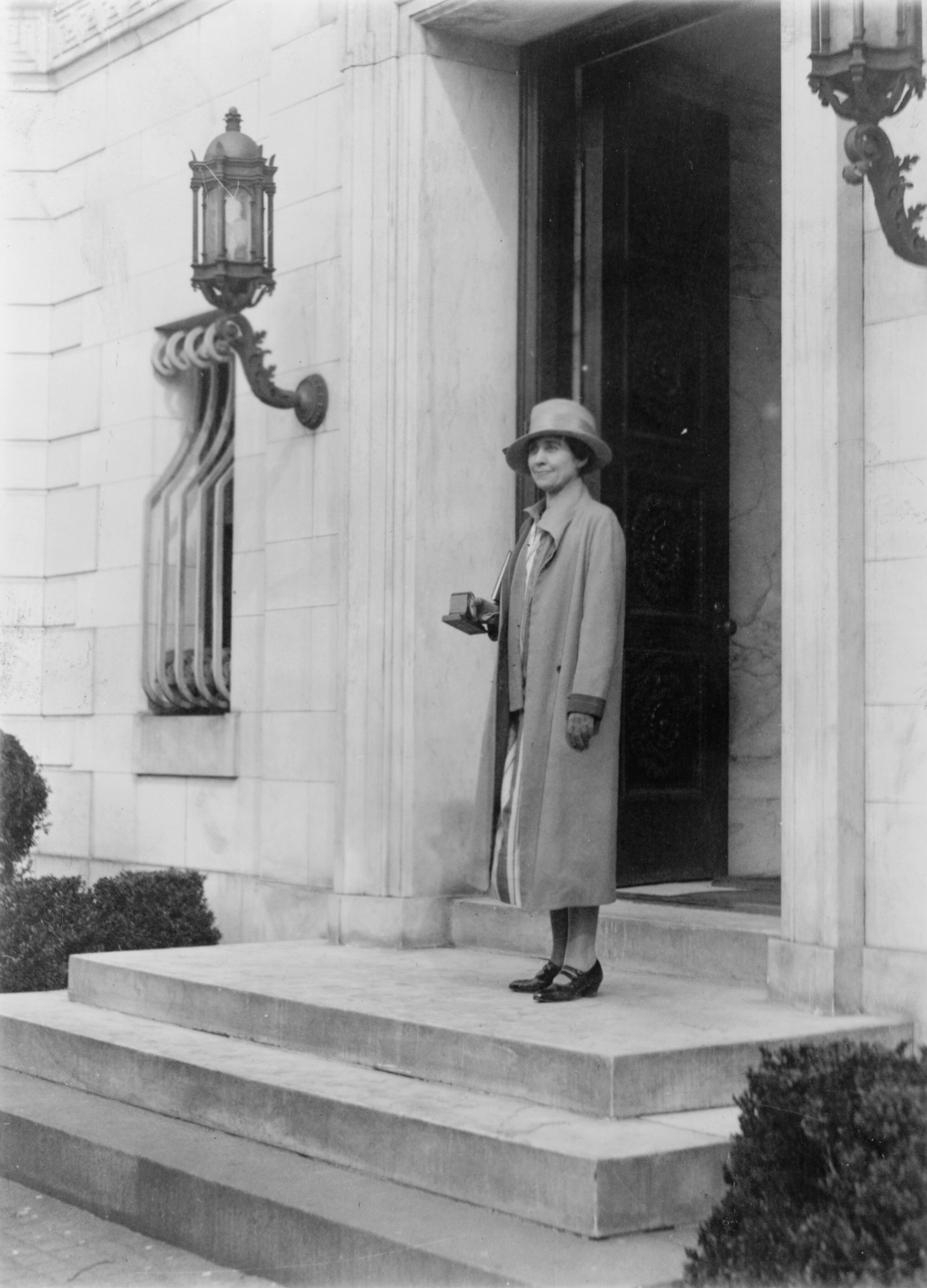
Grace Coolidge at Dupont Circle in 1927

To acquire new furniture for the White House, Coolidge had Congress approve a call for citizens to donate period pieces in 1925. She received only one piece of furniture. When the press discovered that she was to try again the following year, her husband put an end to the idea. She acquired other historical pieces from the White House storerooms.

The White House underwent a significant period of restoration in 1927, so the Coolidges temporarily stayed at Dupont Circle. Coolidge was involved in directing the process, and after the demolition began in March, Coolidge made frequent appearances at the White House to see the construction. While changes to the design of architect Charles Follen McKim would have caused backlash, the replacement of the roof gave Coolidge an opportunity to modify the attic and upper floors, which were separate from McKim's work. Among the changes was a sunroom installed for her use. In her contribution to the refurbishing, she crocheted a bed cover for the Lincoln Bedroom. Separately, she was involved in expanding the White House gardens. In addition to a Vermont spruce tree she planted in her son's memory, she had a birch tree and a lily pond added to the garden.

While at Dupont Circle, the Coolidges hosted Charles Lindbergh after his celebrated Spirit of St. Louis trans-Atlantic flight. Coolidge declined his offer to fly in a plane with him, as one of her husband's rules was that she was not to fly. Lindbergh's visit was a massive event with crowds gathered around the house to see him.

The Coolidges left Dupont Circle in June. From there, they visited the Black Hills in South Dakota. Here Coolidge and her Secret Service guard Jim Haley got lost on one of her walks when they misjudged the terrain. The president had Haley transferred away, depriving his wife of a rare walking partner who could keep up with her and causing rumors that he was acting out of jealousy. This was the only time that Coolidge faced serious public embarrassment as first lady. Instead, Coolidge was assigned to Edmund W. Starling, and she was forbidden from leaving their cabin when Starling went fishing with the president. She stayed in contact with Haley and his wife without her husband's knowledge. The Coolidges returned to Washington in September.

Coolidge did not know about the president's announcement in 1927 that he would not run for another term until after he made it. It is unclear whether she knew of his intention not to run. While she had been unaware of the announcement, she was glad to hear the news. The president's decision was strongly influenced by the emotional divide that had grown between the Coolidges over the previous years and his desire to mend it. The Coolidges took a trip to Cuba in January 1928 to attend the Pan-American Conference, and met with President Gerardo Machado. This made Coolidge the third first lady to leave the United States during her tenure, following Ida Saxton McKinley and Edith Wilson.

=== Illness and departure ===
Coolidge was afflicted with kidney disease in February 1928, which became apparent when she collapsed after an especially strenuous reception. She was secretly taken to the National Naval Medical Center to receive x-rays and a cystoscopy, which revealed that her right kidney was enlarged, infected, obstructed, and out of place. Coolidge spent the following weeks in considerable pain. At its worst, her husband feared that the illness would kill her. Coolidge stayed in her sky parlor as she slowly recovered, resenting the boredom and the rules imposed upon her by the doctors. Calvin Coolidge's own health declined with a weak heart and severe asthma and she watched over his activity to keep his health problems a secret from the press, advocating for him to have a lighter schedule. The Coolidges relocated to Brule, Wisconsin, for the summer to recuperate, and stayed until September. Coolidge also had to go to her mother, who was at the end of her life.

In the final months of her husband's presidency, the Coolidges spent their time on Sapelo Island, Georgia and in Mountain Lake, Florida. They left the White House on March 4, 1929. After years of declining to speak on the radio, Coolidge finally took the microphone after her husband broadcast his farewell address to deliver her own brief message: "Good-bye, folks".

== Later life and death ==
=== Return to private life ===
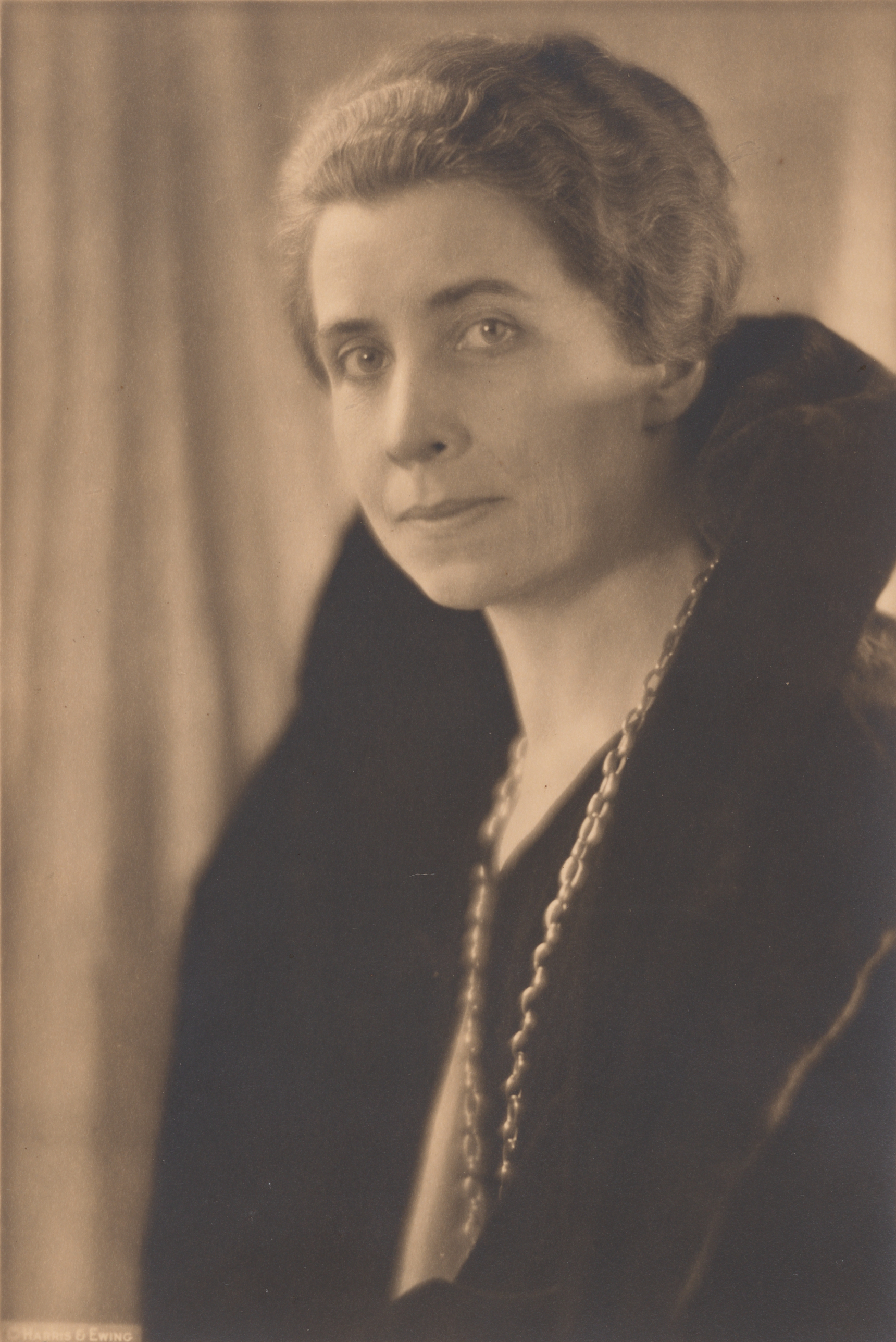
Coolidge in 1931

The Coolidges initially returned to their Northampton home after her husband's presidency, but they moved to a new home just outside of the city, The Beeches, for privacy the following year. The Beeches was larger than their previous home, allowing Coolidge to keep a work room instead of working out of the dining room. They also had a new house constructed near her husband's childhood home where they could spend their summers. Coolidge kept in touch with her successors Lou Henry Hoover and Eleanor Roosevelt.

Coolidge approved of her daughter-in-law Florence Trumbull, the daughter of Connecticut governor John H. Trumbull, after the highly publicized wedding of her son to Trumbull in 1929. The Coolidges traveled across the United States in 1930, visiting Mount Dora, Florida, and then New Orleans before going to California. They stayed at Hearst Castle with William Randolph Hearst, where Coolidge was at one point trapped in an elevator. Her husband refused her request to visit Europe, as he feared possible foreign policy implications of international travel by a former president.

Coolidge regretted how little writing was left by previous first ladies, and she began writing poetry and descriptions of her time in Washington, publishing them in magazines. This included an article about her husband, "The Real Calvin Coolidge". She wrote a poem about her late son titled "The Open Door" on the fifth anniversary of his death, which was published in Good Housekeeping for $250 (equivalent to $5,000 in 2025) and positively received. Her husband encouraged her literary activity and helped get her works published. She also appeared in a promotional film for the Christmas seals drive, in which she rang the bell of the Northampton Memorial Hall and recited a sentence for the camera. Coolidge received honorary degrees from Smith College in June 1929 and the University of Vermont in June 1930. She received a medal from the National Institute of Social Sciences in 1931, and Clarke School's art building was named for her upon its completion in 1933. She was president of the Northampton Republican Women's Club, but this was an honorary position and she did not engage in any political activity with the group.

=== Widowhood ===
Calvin Coolidge died on January 5, 1933, and Coolidge was discomfited by her sudden independence. She took her husband's place as trustee of Mercersburg Academy, Clarke School, and another local school. She inherited his estate of about $700,000 (equivalent to $17,000,000 in 2025). Coolidge became a grandmother with the birth of Cynthia Coolidge later that year; she feared becoming an imposing mother-in-law and tried to limit her involvement in the child's upbringing. She closely followed the events of the Lindbergh kidnapping, especially during the trial of Richard Hauptmann in 1934. With her husband's death, Coolidge started breaking some of the rules he had set for her throughout their lives. This was accelerated when she befriended the feminist Florence Adams, who encouraged this new lifestyle. Coolidge bobbed her hair, and she began wearing hiking shorts and trousers. She learned how to drive a car, and in 1936 she flew in a plane with Governor Trumbull.

Coolidge became more politically active later in life. She helped campaign for the reelection of President Herbert Hoover in the 1932 election. She was not entirely opposed to Franklin D. Roosevelt during his presidency, though she did not speak publicly on the matter. She avoided involvement in biographies about her husband so as not to look like she was influencing them, though she provided several interviews for biographer Claude Fuess in the years following his presidency. She became board president of Clarke School in 1935; she worked directly with classrooms and kept up with research related to hearing aids. A false rumor spread that she was to marry Congressman Everett Sanders.

Coolidge spent much of her time at Adams' vacation home in North Carolina, where the pair found peace from public scrutiny. She made her final visit to Washington in December 1934, where she and Adams saw the Works Projects Administration constructing new government buildings and visited the first ladies' gowns collection in the Smithsonian Institution. Wearing horn-rimmed glasses to alter her appearance, she was recognized by only a single traffic officer who had once served on the presidential yacht, the USS Mayflower. In 1936, Coolidge went with Adams on a six-month tour of Europe where they drove across ten countries. When they returned, she sold The Beeches and had Road Forks, a house in Northampton, built for her. The pair regularly listened to baseball games over the radio, and on occasion they drove to Boston with their friend Joseph D. Collins to watch a game. Coolidge took up reading more heavily around this time and kept up with popular novels. Her second granddaughter, Lydia Coolidge, was born in 1939.

Coolidge supported American involvement in World War II, and she began raising funds for child refugees from Germany in 1939. When the U.S. entered the war, she offered support to the Red Cross and the WAVES. She lent Road Forks to WAVES' Captain Herbert W. Underwood as the organization was operating out of nearby Smith College. Meanwhile, she lived in the home of Adams and their other friend Julia Warner Snow across the street. Coolidge also volunteered as a civil defense watcher, where each week she spent three hours as a lookout for a possible German bombing of the U.S., though none ever occurred. Wishing to avoid publicity, she chose not to become head of the Massachusetts Women's Defense Corps.

Ivah Gale, Coolidge's long-time friend, lived with her off-and-on at Road Forks beginning in 1946. They were later accompanied by the Coolidge family chauffeur John Bukosky and another friend, Lilian Carver. Coolidge's tenure as board president of Clarke School ended in 1952, but she remained as a board member for the remainder of her life. She supported Dwight D. Eisenhower in the 1952 presidential election even before he was nominated as a candidate. Coolidge was afflicted by heart problems later in life. Her heart did not fully recover after an illness in 1952, and an elevator was put into Road Forks for her. Her health declined significantly in 1954, and she was hospitalized at one point in 1955. She went out less frequently as she feared the spectacle of dying in public. Though she was no longer healthy enough to visit Clarke School in her final years, its president and its principal continued working with her to develop school programs. Coolidge died at Road Forks of kyphoscoliosis-induced heart disease on July 8, 1957.

== Legacy ==
=== Contemporary image ===
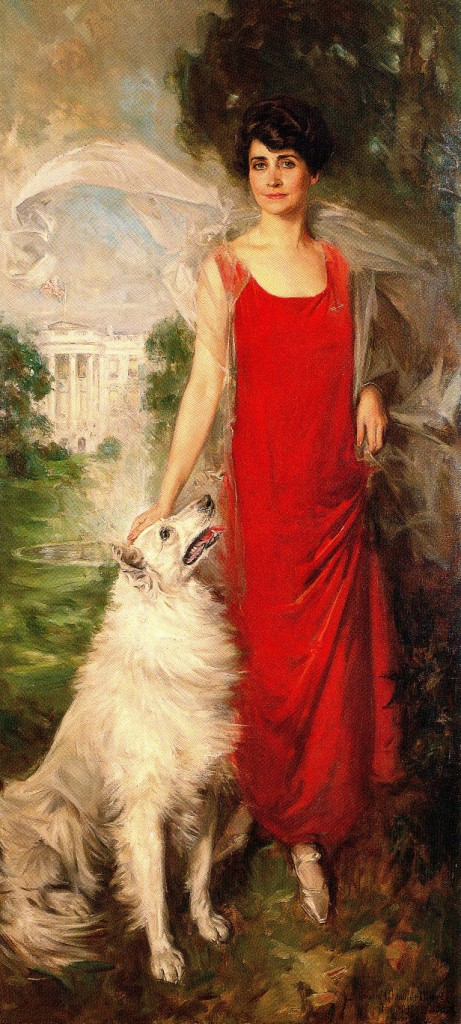
Grace Coolidge official portrait by Howard Chandler Christy

Coolidge's legacy as first lady is most associated with her charm and cheerfulness. By the time she was second lady, Coolidge had already become one of the most popular social figures in Washington D.C. This was unusual for what was typically a less important role in Washington society. Her relative youth, photogenic appearance, and fashion sense brought a revitalization to the role of the first lady, although she kept a reserved demeanor at her husband's request. Journalists characterized her as "the college type of woman". Her popularity invited comparisons to former first ladies Frances Cleveland and Dolley Madison. Clarke School principal George T. Pratt saw her work with deaf children as legitimizing the profession.

Positive appraisals were made by the press, with laudatory profiles in The New Yorker and Good Housekeeping among other publications. The New York Times described her as being among the "most photographed persons on earth outside of movieland" in 1928. After meeting Coolidge, the humorist Will Rogers said she was "Public Female Favorite No. 1". She was generally seen as a more domestic figure in contrast to the active feminist movement of the day.

Coolidge's fashion influenced popular trends in the 1920s, especially in her choice of headwear, and she tried to present a modest approach to the styles of the time. When knee-length skirts were common apparel, Coolidge wore longer skirts and gowns that were at most 10.5 inches from the ground. First lady biographer Betty Boyd Caroli said that Coolidge "epitomized current flapper style", though she was not herself a flapper. Her husband admired her appearance and took an interest in her wardrobe. He often helped her pick dresses to wear during events and went clothes shopping with her. The otherwise frugal man imposed no budget for her clothes. Despite her husband's preference for picture hats, Coolidge eventually adopted the style of short, close-fitting hats of the 1920s. Each dress she wore as first lady was scrutinized by the press. The attention on her clothing influenced the importance of fashion for future first ladies and their role in setting fashion trends.

Howard Chandler Christy painted Coolidge's portrait in 1924, depicting her in a red dress alongside her white collie Rob Roy. This was done on the initiative of Pi Beta Phi, which had funded the project to accompany the president's official painting. The painting hung in the China Room until it was moved to the Red Room by first lady Jacqueline Kennedy in 1961. The red dress in the painting reinforced an association of Coolidge with the color. Another painting of Coolidge was done by Christy depicting her in white.

Many people close to the Coolidges felt that Coolidge benefited her husband. The suffragette Florence Jaffray Harriman considered her "the administration's greatest success". Vera Bloom, the daughter of Congressman Sol Bloom, said that Coolidge was worth one million dollars a year for the Republican Party. Her husband's political backer Stearns credited Coolidge's ability to quickly make friends and her decision to "not meddle with" her husband's political activity as assets. Secretary of Labor James J. Davis compared her management of the public to be on par with a campaign manager. Her involvement in child welfare, and her practice of traveling with the president, set precedents for succeeding first ladies. Coolidge's popularity pushed the first ladyship into a more public-facing role, adding a new facet to the job that persisted through future generations of first ladies.

=== Historical study ===
Historians have debated how much Coolidge affected her husband's political career. Biographers Robert Hugh Ferrell and Kristie Miller attribute her presence as a reason for his success, describing her personality as a necessary balance to his reservedness that may have otherwise lost him support. Contemporary observers, such as Gamaliel Bradford and William Allen White, commented that the president had an emotional dependence on his wife, which he himself acknowledged. Multiple people who knew the Coolidges attested to his devotion to Coolidge, with one friend saying that he "worshiped" her. At the same time, she believed that he looked down on her intellectually.

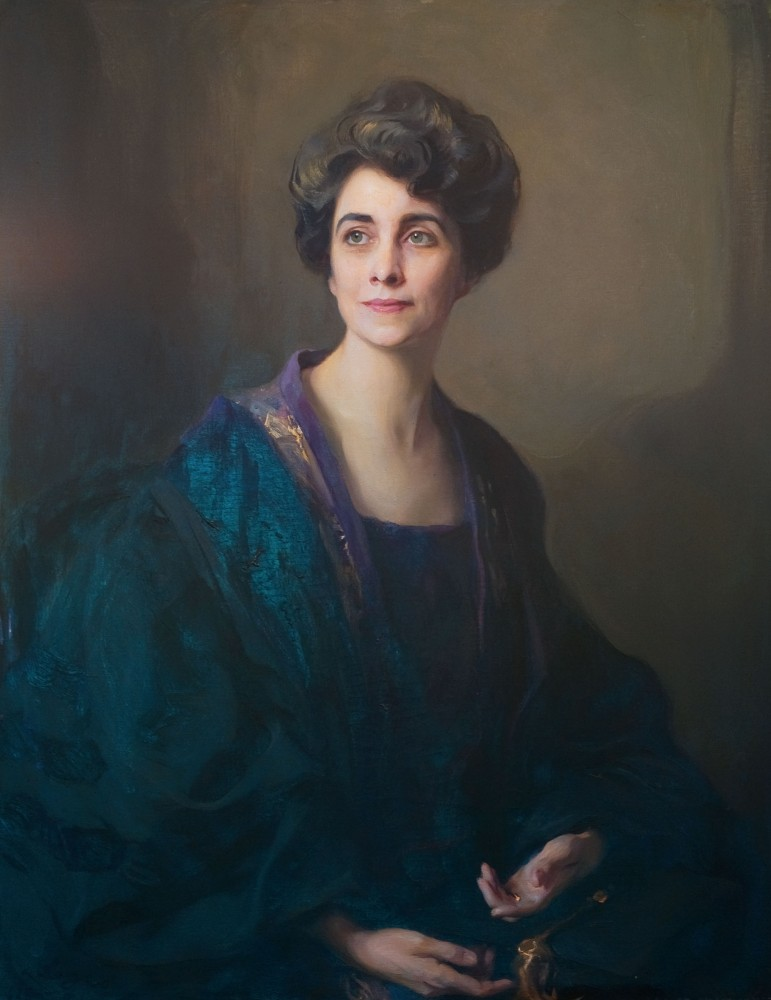
Portrait of Coolidge

Ferrell cited Coolidge's ability to provide her husband a calm home life without arguments or marital problems as an asset. He was quick to anger, and she was often the one tasked with de-escalating him. This typically did not bother her, but during periods of frustration she distracted herself with knitting. Historians have given varied accounts regarding how happy she was in the relationship, and its exact nature remains disputed. He imposed a number of rules on her about how she was to dress and act in public, and she needed his permission to visit her parents or travel to events. Her biographer Ishbel Ross emphasized their devotion to each other and their shared sense of humor, though she also cast doubt on Coolidge's happy acceptance of the rules her husband imposed on her. Biographers Paul Boller, Betty Boyd Caroli, and Carl Sferrazza Anthony expressed similar concerns, though Boller also considered her periods of unhappiness to be rare.

Coolidge's place in the public consciousness faded after her tenure, and she became one of the more obscure first ladies. Her lack of political involvement and her adherence to traditional expectations meant that she had no well-known accomplishments to keep her in the public's memory. Her effort to collect antique furniture from the public was revitalized more successfully by first lady Jacqueline Kennedy.

Correspondences and other papers from Coolidge's life have been kept by the Calvin Coolidge Presidential Library, the Coolidge Foundation, and the Vermont Historical Society. Lawrence E. Wikander and Robert Hugh Ferrell published a collection of her papers and autobiographical writings titled Grace Coolidge: An Autobiography in 1992. The first major biography about her was Grace Coolidge and Her Era: The Story of a President's Wife written by Ishbel Ross and published in 1962. The book was written in part using direct accounts from Coolidge's son John Coolidge, her daughter-in-law Florence Coolidge, and her friends Florence Adams and Ivah Gale. Cynthia Bittinger of the Calvin Coolidge Memorial Foundation released Grace Coolidge: Sudden Star in 2005, and Robert Hugh Ferrell released Grace Coolidge: The People's Lady in Silent Cal's White House in 2008. Although Coolidge was more active later in her life, this has received relatively little scholarly attention.

Since 1982, Siena College Research Institute has periodically conducted surveys asking historians to assess American first ladies, where Coolidge ranked 17th of 42 in 1982, 19th of 37 in 1993, 17th of 38 in 2003, 17th of 38 in 2008, 21st of 39 in 2014, and 25th of 40 in 2020.

== Notes ==
Honorary titles
Preceded by Margaret O'Brien	First Lady of Northampton, Massachusetts; 1910–1911	Succeeded by Catherine Feiker
Vacant Title last held by Beatrice Barry	Second Lady of Massachusetts; 1916–1919	Succeeded by Mary Cox
Preceded by Ella McCall	First Lady of Massachusetts; 1919–1921	Succeeded by Mary Cox
Preceded by Lois Marshall	Second Lady of the United States; 1921–1923	Vacant Title next held by Caro Dawes
Preceded by Florence Harding	First Lady of the United States; 1923–1929	Succeeded by Lou Hoover
