= Carrie Babcock Sherman =

Second Lady of the United States (1856–1931)

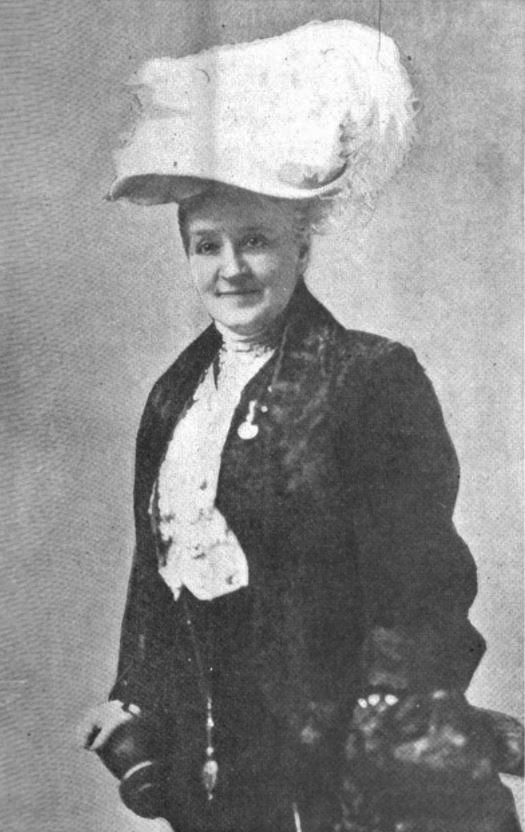

Second Lady of the United States
- In role March 4, 1909 – October 30, 1912
- Vice President: James S. Sherman
- Preceded by: Cornelia Fairbanks
- Succeeded by: Lois Marshall

Personal details
- Born: Carrie Babcock; November 16, 1856 Utica, New York, U.S.
- Died: October 6, 1931 (aged 74) Utica, New York, U.S.
- Resting place: Forest Hill Cemetery; Utica, New York, U.S.
- Spouse: James Sherman (m. 1881; died 1912)
- Children: 3

Carrie Babcock Sherman (née Babcock; November 16, 1856 – October 6, 1931) was the wife of Vice President James S. Sherman and thus second lady of the United States from 1909 to 1912. She was born and died in Utica, New York.

The daughter of Lewis Hamilton Babcock, a prominent attorney, and Ellen Catherine Babcock (née Sherrill), she had two siblings, Sherrill Babcock, a soldier, and Anita Babcock DeLong. Her grandfather was Congressman and Union brigade commander Eliakim Sherrill, killed at Gettysburg.

She married James Schoolcraft Sherman on January 26, 1881. The two had known each other since childhood.

The couple had three sons: Sherrill B. Sherman (1883–1962), Richard U. Sherman (1884–1951), and Thomas M. Sherman (1885–1944).

When her husband became vice-president in March 1909, Carrie became the first second lady to accompany her spouse in the inaugural parade, riding to and from the ceremony at the U.S. Capitol.

Sherman died aged 74, and is buried at Forest Hill Cemetery in Utica, New York, alongside her husband.

Honorary titles
Preceded by Cornelia Fairbanks	Second Lady of the United States; 1909–1912	Vacant Title next held by Lois Marshall
