= Second Lady or Second Gentleman of the United States =

Spouse of the vice president of the United States

Second Lady of the United States
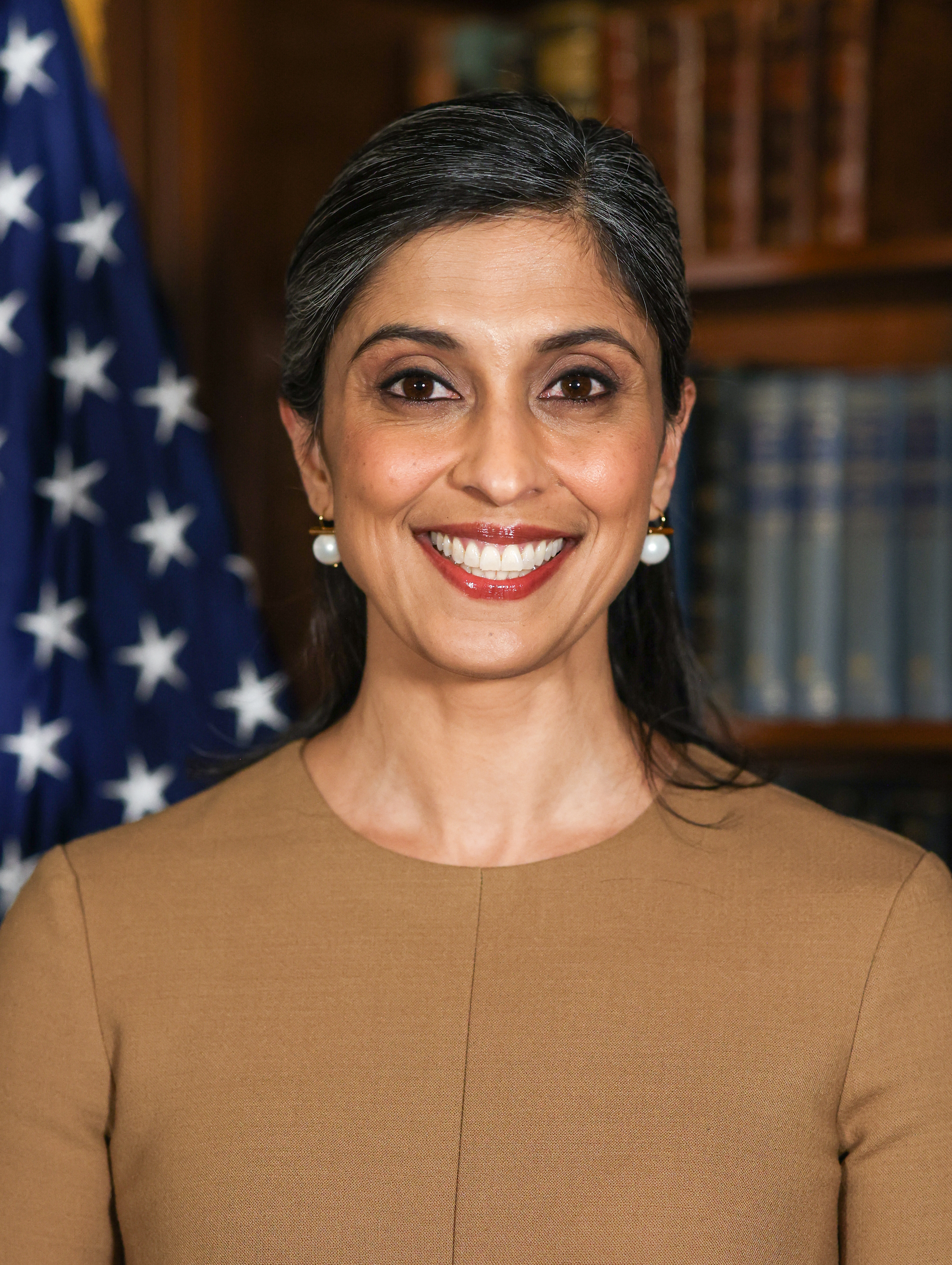
- Current; Usha Vance since January 20, 2025
- Office of the Second Lady or Second Gentleman of the United States
- Style: Mrs. Vance; Madam Second Lady
- Abbreviation: SLOTUS (for second lady)
- Residence: Number One Observatory Circle
- Appointer: Vice President of the United States (by marriage)
- Inaugural holder: Abigail Adams (as second lady); Douglas Emhoff (as second gentleman)
- Formation: April 21, 1789 (237 years ago)
- Website: Official website

The second lady of the United States or second gentleman (SLOTUS or SGOTUS) is the informal title held by the spouse of the vice president of the United States, concurrent with the vice president's term of office. The current second lady is Usha Vance, wife of JD Vance.

Coined in contrast to "first lady" – albeit used less commonly – the title "second lady" was apparently first used by Jennie Tuttle Hobart (wife of Garret Hobart, vice president 1897–1899) to refer to herself. The first second gentleman of the United States was Doug Emhoff, the husband of Kamala Harris, the vice president from 2021 to 2025.

Twelve second ladies have gone on to become first ladies during their husbands' terms as president. The first was Abigail Adams, who was married to John Adams, the first vice president from 1789 to 1797 and then the second president from 1797 to 1801. The most recent was Jill Biden, married to Joe Biden, the 47th vice president from 2009 to 2017 and then the 46th president from 2021 to 2025.

Since the 1970s, the vice presidential official residence is Number One Observatory Circle in Washington, D.C.

== History ==
The second spouse's visibility in the public sphere is a recent development. Although the role of the first lady as White House hostess dates from the beginning of the republic (and was typically filled by another member of the president's family if the president was unmarried or a widower), it was not until the late 20th and early 21st century that vice-presidential wives took on visible public roles.

One exception was Floride Calhoun, wife of Vice President John C. Calhoun, who was a central figure in the Petticoat Affair, a social-political scandal involving the social ostracism of Secretary of War John H. Eaton and his wife Margaret O'Neill Eaton.

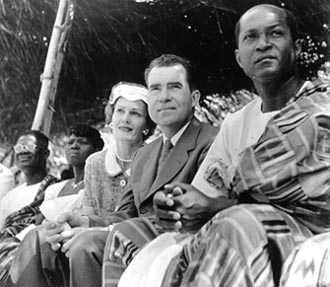
Second Lady Pat Nixon, with Vice President Richard Nixon, led a delegation to Ghana in 1957. One historian wrote that Pat Nixon "helped to define this nebulous role for an entire generation of women who would succeed her".

In 1978, Muriel Humphrey, wife of Vice President Hubert Humphrey, became the only former second lady to hold public office; after her husband, who had returned to the U.S. Senate after his term as vice president, died in office, she was appointed by Minnesota governor Rudy Perpich to continue her husband's term.

There have been 17 periods of vacancy in the role, the longest of which continued for 16 years between the service of vice presidential spouses Abigail Adams and Ann Gerry when there were three widower vice presidents and a one-year vacancy in the vice presidency. The most recent second lady vacancy was for 132 days in 1974, between the service of Betty Ford and Happy Rockefeller, when the vice presidency was also vacant.

=== Role in practice ===
The role of the second lady or gentleman is unpaid and not formally defined. The wife of the vice president of the United States was traditionally expected to serve as a hostess and appear at society functions. Jennie Tuttle Hobart, wife of Vice President Garret Hobart (1897–1899) is often said to be the first woman to style herself as "Second Lady". Hobart took over the hostess duties on behalf of First Lady Ida Saxton McKinley, who had chronic health issues including epilepsy. Starting in 1917, the wife of the vice president took on the unofficial role of convener of the Red Cross Senate Wives, presiding over their lunches; the organization later became known as the Senate Spouses Club. The question of the second lady's status became a topic of debate in 1929 when Dolly Curtis Gann, the sister of Vice President Charles Curtis (1929–1933), assumed the role of hostess on his behalf, since he was widowed. Gann had waged a public "battle of precedence" against Alice Roosevelt Longworth, the wife of former speaker of the House Nicholas Longworth.

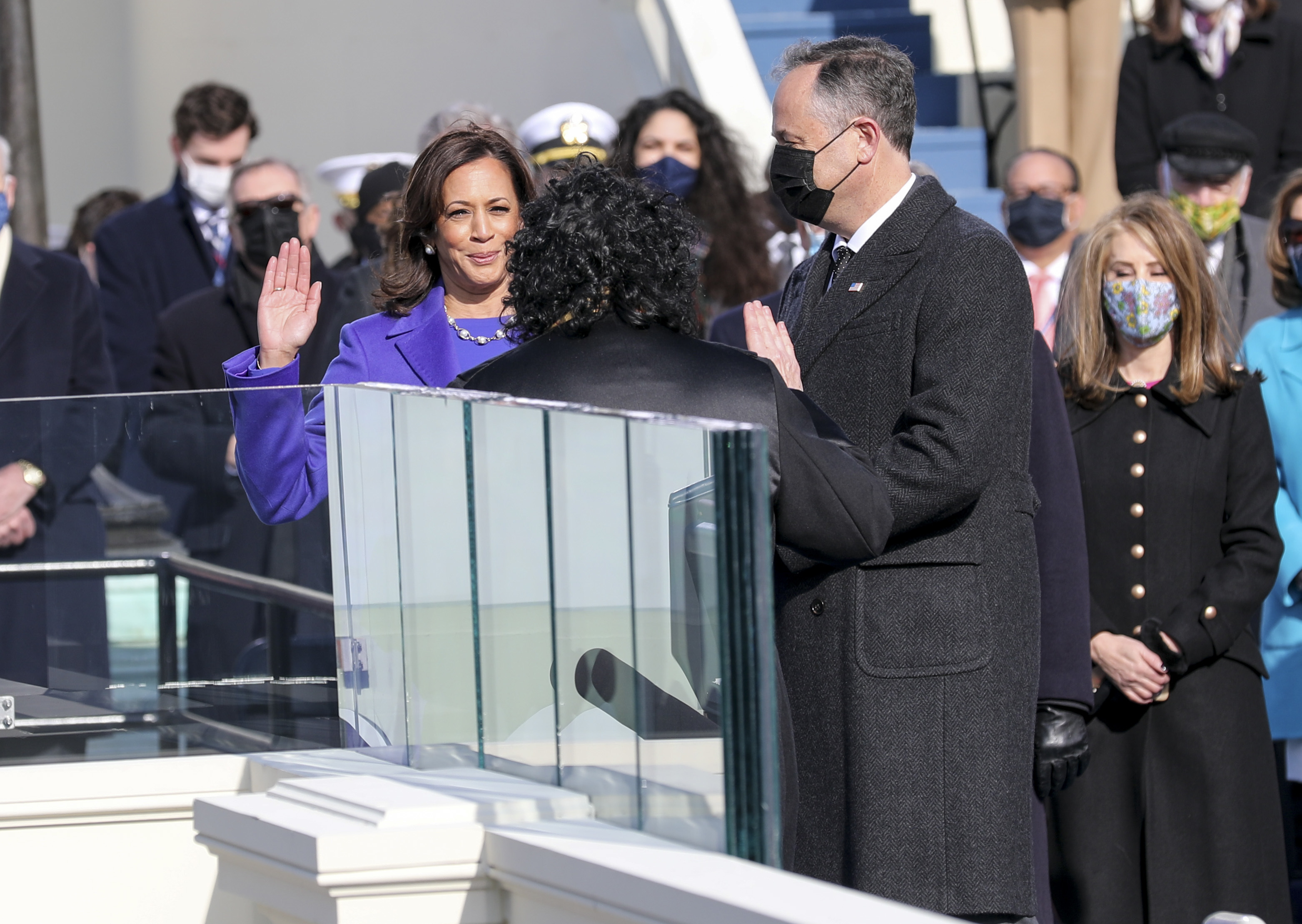
Doug Emhoff (right), the first second gentleman of the United States, standing next to his wife, Kamala Harris (left), the first female American vice president, during her inauguration on January 20, 2021.

Over time, the spouse of the vice president started to become more visible as the Office of the Vice President itself gained power and influence, and assumed additional responsibilities. In 2010, Marie Claire magazine described the role of second ladies as being "relegated to roast-chicken charity dinners and sit-and-smile political functions. They cherry-pick a cause or two...and pretty much stay out of the way." Presidential historian Gil Troy noted that during the Kennedy administration, one of Second Lady Lady Bird Johnson's roles was to replace First Lady Jacqueline Kennedy when she withdrew from public appearances, often at the last minute; Johnson replaced Kennedy on more than 50 occasions.

Pat Nixon, wife of Vice President Richard Nixon, was the first second spouse to add a great deal of substance to the role of the vice president's wife. When Nixon assumed the position in 1953, the role's only official function was to preside over the once-annual Senate Ladies Luncheon. Instead, Nixon launched her own initiatives, sensing great opportunities that her role provided. She established a schedule separate from that of her husband, which often consisted of solo activities. As second lady, Nixon traveled more than 125,000 miles around the world to six continents, including a two-month, 42,000-mile journey through Asia in 1953. As she undertook missions of goodwill across the world, she insisted on visiting schools, orphanages, hospitals and village markets rather than attend tea or coffee functions. In this sense, Nixon essentially created the modern role of the second lady; historian Kate Andersen Brower wrote, "she helped to define this nebulous role for an entire generation of women who would succeed her." Historian Cormac O'Brien says that Pat Nixon "may have well been the most extraordinary second lady in American history" because of her role in accompanying Vice President Richard Nixon on a tour of the world as a goodwill ambassador. She also traveled independently of the vice president and attended events, including campaign tours, on her own. According to O'Brien, Second Lady Nixon proved popular "as a paragon of graciousness, composure, and elegance", and made a conscious effort to travel to locations where local women were banned, to spread a subtle message for equal rights.

During the Reagan administration, Second Lady Barbara Bush hosted more than one thousand events and traveled over 1.5 million miles at home and abroad over eight years, and championed literacy, a cause she continued to support when she later became First Lady.

Tipper Gore, former wife of Vice President Al Gore, was active in several campaigns to remove material she found objectionable from popular American entertainment, including films, television shows and music, starting when her husband was a senator. She challenged performers over their use of profane lyrics and often debated with her critics, such as Dead Kennedys singer Jello Biafra. Lynne Cheney, wife of Vice President Dick Cheney, championed education reform, citing specific failures of the American public education system during her tenure as second lady. She is a particularly outspoken supporter of American history education, having written five bestselling books on this topic for children and their families. Jill Biden, wife of President Joe Biden, worked as an English professor at Northern Virginia Community College, and is thought to be the first second lady to hold a paying job while her husband was vice president. She has been involved in various causes, including breast cancer awareness and literacy.

Douglas Emhoff, husband of Vice President Kamala Harris, became the first second gentleman of the United States when his wife became the first female vice president in 2021. He is also the first Jewish person to assume this ceremonial role. Emhoff is a law professor at Georgetown University Law Center. His priorities in office were advocating for food security across the United States, fighting antisemitism on the international stage, addressing climate change, as well as pushing for equal access to justice. He traveled to several countries representing the United States, including France, Germany, Poland, Japan, South Korea, Philippines, Thailand, Ghana, Tanzania, and Zambia among others, having met with heads of state and attended inaugurations and state dinners.

In 2025 Usha Vance became the first Asian American, Telugu American, and Hindu American second lady when her husband JD Vance became vice president.

== Causes and initiatives ==
- Joan Mondale: Art
- Barbara Bush: Literacy
- Marilyn Quayle: Early diagnosis of breast cancer
- Tipper Gore: Removing objectionable materials in popular American entertainment
- Lynne Cheney: History of the United States
- Jill Biden: "Joining Forces"; military families
- Karen Pence: Art therapy; military families
- Doug Emhoff: Food security; climate change; combatting antisemitism
- Usha Vance: Childhood literacy

== List of second ladies and gentlemen of the United States ==
Image	Second Lady or Gentleman	Vice President Marriage date	Tenure	Date of birth	Date of death (age)	Tenure as First Lady
	Abigail Adams (née Abigail Smith) 1st second lady	John Adams; October 25, 1764	April 21, 1789 – March 4, 1797	November 22, 1744	October 28, 1818 (73 years, 340 days)	1797–1801
Vacant; Thomas Jefferson was a widower.			March 4, 1797 – March 4, 1801			
Vacant; Aaron Burr was a widower.			March 4, 1801 – March 4, 1805			
Vacant; George Clinton was a widower.			March 4, 1805 – April 20, 1812			
Vacant; no vice president after Clinton's death.			April 20, 1812 – March 4, 1813			
	Ann Gerry (née Ann Thompson) 2nd second lady	Elbridge Gerry; January 12, 1786	March 4, 1813 – November 23, 1814	August 12, 1763	March 17, 1849 (aged 85)	
Vacant; no vice president after Gerry's death.			November 23, 1814 – March 4, 1817			
	Hannah Tompkins (née Hannah Minthorne) 3rd second lady	Daniel D Tompkins; February 20, 1798	March 4, 1817 – March 4, 1825	August 28, 1781	February 18, 1829 (aged 47)	
	Floride Bonneau Calhoun (née Floride Bonneau Colhoun) 4th second lady	John C. Calhoun; January 8, 1811	March 4, 1825 – December 28, 1832	February 15, 1792	July 25, 1866 (aged 74)	
Vacant; no vice president after Calhoun's resignation.			December 28, 1832 – March 4, 1833			
Vacant; Martin Van Buren was a widower.			March 4, 1833 – March 4, 1837			
Vacant; Richard M. Johnson was a widower			March 4, 1837 – March 4, 1841			
	Letitia Tyler (née Letitia Christian) 5th second lady	John Tyler; March 29, 1813	March 4, 1841 – April 4, 1841	November 12, 1790	September 12, 1842 (aged 51)	1841–1842
Vacant; no vice president after Tyler assumed presidency.			April 4, 1841 – March 4, 1845			
	Sophia Dallas (née Sophia Chew Nicklin) 6th second lady	George M. Dallas; May 23, 1816	March 4, 1845 – March 4, 1849	June 24, 1798	January 11, 1869 (aged 70)	
	Abigail Fillmore (née Abigail Powers) 7th second lady	Millard Fillmore; February 5, 1826	March 4, 1849 – July 9, 1850	March 13, 1798	March 30, 1853 (aged 55)	1850–1853
Vacant; no vice president after Fillmore assumed presidency.			July 9, 1850 – March 4, 1853			
Vacant; William R. King was unmarried.			March 4, 1853 – April 18, 1853			
Vacant; no vice president after King’s death.			April 18, 1853 – March 4, 1857			
	Mary Cyrene Burch Breckinridge (née Mary Cyrene Burch) 8th second lady	John C. Breckinridge; December 12, 1843	March 4, 1857 – March 4, 1861	August 16, 1826	October 8, 1907 (aged 81)	
	Ellen Hamlin (née Ellen Vesta Emery) 9th second lady	Hannibal Hamlin; September 25, 1856	March 4, 1861 – March 4, 1865	September 14, 1835	February 1, 1925 (aged 89)	
	Eliza McCardle Johnson (née Eliza McCardle) 10th second lady	Andrew Johnson; May 17, 1827	March 4, 1865 – April 15, 1865	October 4, 1810	January 15, 1876 (aged 65)	1865–1869
Vacant; no vice president after Johnson assumed presidency.			April 15, 1865 – March 4, 1869			
	Ellen Maria Colfax (née Ellen Maria Wade) 11th second lady	Schuyler Colfax; November 18, 1868	March 4, 1869 – March 4, 1873	July 26, 1836	March 4, 1911 (aged 74)	
Vacant; Henry Wilson was a widower.			March 4, 1873 – November 22, 1875			
Vacant; William A. Wheeler was a widower.			March 4, 1877 – March 4, 1881			
Vacant; Chester A. Arthur was a widower.			March 4, 1881 – September 19, 1881			
Vacant; no vice president after Arthur assumed presidency.			September 19, 1881 – March 4, 1885			
	Eliza Hendricks (née Eliza Carol Morgan) 12th second lady	Thomas A. Hendricks; September 26, 1845	March 4, 1885 – November 25, 1885	November 23, 1823	November 3, 1903 (aged 79)	
Vacant; no vice president after Hendricks's death.			November 25, 1885 – March 4, 1889			
	Anna Morton (née Anna Livingston Reade Street) 13th second lady	Levi P. Morton; February 12, 1873	March 4, 1889 – March 4, 1893	May 18, 1846	August 14, 1918 (aged 72)	
	Letitia Stevenson (née Letitia Green) 14th second lady	Adlai Stevenson I December 22, 1866	March 4, 1893 – March 4, 1897	January 8, 1843	December 25, 1913 (aged 70)	
	Esther Jane "Jennie" Tuttle Hobart (née Esther Jane Tuttle) 15th second lady	Garret Hobart; July 21, 1869	March 4, 1897 – November 21, 1899	April 30, 1849	January 8, 1941 (aged 91)	
Vacant; no vice president after Hobart's death.			November 21, 1899 – March 4, 1901			
	Edith Roosevelt (née Edith Kermit Carow) 16th second lady	Theodore Roosevelt; December 2, 1886	March 4, 1901 – September 14, 1901	August 6, 1861	September 30, 1948 (aged 87)	1901–1909
Vacant; no vice president after Roosevelt assumed presidency.			September 14, 1901 – March 4, 1905			
	Cornelia "Nellie" Cole Fairbanks (née Cornelia Cole) 17th second lady	Charles W. Fairbanks; October 6, 1874	March 4, 1905 – March 4, 1909	January 14, 1852	October 24, 1913 (aged 61)	
	Carrie Babcock Sherman (née Carrie Babcock) 18th second lady	James S. Sherman; January 26, 1881	March 4, 1909 – October 30, 1912	November 16, 1856	October 6, 1931 (aged 74)	
Vacant; no vice president after Sherman's death.			October 30, 1912 – March 4, 1913			
	Lois Irene Marshall (née Lois Irene Kimsey) 19th second lady	Thomas R. Marshall; October 2, 1895	March 4, 1913 – March 4, 1921	May 9, 1873	January 6, 1958 (aged 84)	
	Grace Coolidge (née Grace Anna Goodhue) 20th second lady	Calvin Coolidge; October 4, 1905	March 4, 1921 – August 2, 1923	January 3, 1879	July 8, 1957 (aged 78)	1923–1929
Vacant; no vice president after Coolidge assumed presidency.			August 2, 1923 – March 4, 1925			
	Caro Dawes (née Caro Dana Blymyer) 21st second lady	Charles G. Dawes; January 24, 1889	March 4, 1925 – March 4, 1929	January 6, 1866	October 3, 1957 (aged 91)	
	Dolly Curtis Gann (née Dolly Curtis) Acting	Charles Curtis; Brother	March 4, 1929 – March 4, 1933	September 24, 1863	January 31, 1953 (aged 89)	
	Mariette Elizabeth "Ettie" Garner (née Mariette Elizabeth Rheiner) 22nd second lady	John Nance Garner; November 25, 1895	March 4, 1933 – January 20, 1941	July 17, 1869	August 17, 1948 (aged 79)	
	Ilo Wallace (née Ilo Browne) 23rd second lady	Henry A. Wallace; May 20, 1914	January 20, 1941 – January 20, 1945	March 10, 1888	February 22, 1981 (aged 92)	
	Bess Truman (née Elizabeth Virginia Wallace) 24th second lady	Harry S. Truman; June 28, 1919	January 20, 1945 – April 12, 1945	February 13, 1885	October 18, 1982 (aged 97)	1945–1953
Vacant; no vice president after Truman assumed presidency.			April 12, 1945 – January 20, 1949			
Vacant; Alben W. Barkley was a widower.			January 20, 1949 – November 18, 1949			
	Jane Hadley Barkley (née Elizabeth Jane Rucker) 25th second lady	Alben W. Barkley; November 18, 1949	November 18, 1949 – January 20, 1953	September 23, 1911	September 6, 1964 (aged 52)	
	Pat Nixon (née Thelma Catherine Ryan) 26th second lady	Richard Nixon; June 21, 1940	January 20, 1953 – January 20, 1961	March 16, 1912	June 22, 1993 (aged 81)	1969–1974
	Claudia "Lady Bird" Johnson (née Claudia Alta Taylor) 27th second lady	Lyndon B. Johnson; November 17, 1934	January 20, 1961 – November 22, 1963	December 22, 1912	July 11, 2007 (aged 94)	1963–1969
Vacant; no vice president after Johnson assumed presidency.			November 22, 1963 – January 20, 1965			
	Muriel Humphrey Brown (née Muriel Fay Buck) 28th second lady	Hubert Humphrey; September 3, 1936	January 20, 1965 – January 20, 1969	February 20, 1912	September 20, 1998 (aged 86)	
	Elinor "Judy" Agnew (née Elinor Isabel Judefind) 29th second lady	Spiro Agnew; May 27, 1942	January 20, 1969 – October 10, 1973	April 23, 1921	June 20, 2012 (aged 91)	
Vacant; no vice president between Agnew's resignation and Ford's confirmation under the 25th Amendment.			October 10, 1973 – December 6, 1973			
	Elizabeth "Betty" Ford (née Elizabeth Anne Bloomer) 30th second lady	Gerald Ford; October 15, 1948	December 6, 1973 – August 9, 1974	April 8, 1918	July 8, 2011 (aged 93)	1974–1977
Vacant; no vice president between Ford assuming the presidency and Rockefeller's confirmation under the 25th Amendment.			August 9, 1974 – December 19, 1974			
	Margaretta "Happy" Rockefeller (née Margaretta Large Fitler) 31st second lady	Nelson Rockefeller; May 4, 1963	December 19, 1974 – January 20, 1977	June 9, 1926	May 19, 2015 (aged 88)	
	Joan Mondale (née Joan Adams) 32nd second lady	Walter Mondale; December 27, 1955	January 20, 1977 – January 20, 1981	August 8, 1930	February 3, 2014 (aged 83)	
	Barbara Bush (née Barbara Pierce) 33rd second lady	George H. W. Bush; January 6, 1945	January 20, 1981 – January 20, 1989	June 8, 1925	April 17, 2018 (aged 92)	1989–1993
	Marilyn Quayle (née Marilyn Tucker) 34th second lady	Dan Quayle; November 18, 1972	January 20, 1989 – January 20, 1993	July 29, 1949	Living; 77 years, 99 days	
	Mary Elizabeth "Tipper" Gore (née Mary Elizabeth Aitcheson) 35th second lady	Al Gore; May 19, 1970	January 20, 1993 – January 20, 2001	August 19, 1948	Living; 78 years, 78 days	
	Lynne Cheney (née Lynne Ann Vincent) 36th second lady	Dick Cheney; August 29, 1964	January 20, 2001 – January 20, 2009	August 14, 1941	Living; 85 years, 83 days	
	Jill Biden (née Jill Tracy Jacobs) 37th second lady	Joe Biden; June 17, 1977	January 20, 2009 – January 20, 2017	June 3, 1951	Living; 75 years, 155 days	2021–2025
	Karen Pence (née Karen Sue Batten) 38th second lady	Mike Pence; June 8, 1985	January 20, 2017 – January 20, 2021	January 1, 1957	Living; 69 years, 308 days	
	Douglas Craig Emhoff 1st second gentleman	Kamala Harris; August 22, 2014	January 20, 2021 – January 20, 2025	October 13, 1964	Living; 62 years, 23 days	
	Usha Vance (née Usha Bala Chilukuri) 39th second lady	JD Vance; June 14, 2014	January 20, 2025 – present	January 6, 1986	Living; 40 years, 303 days	

== Other spouses of U.S. vice presidents ==
Various other spouses of vice presidents of the United States are not considered as second ladies of the United States because their marriages were not during the vice presidential terms of their spouses.

Nine U.S. vice presidents were widowed prior to their vice presidencies:

- Thomas Jefferson was married to Martha Wayles from 1772 until her death in 1782.
- Aaron Burr was married to Theodosia Bartow Prevost from 1782 until her death in 1794.
- George Clinton was married to Sarah Tappen from 1770 until her death in 1800.
- Martin Van Buren was married to Hannah Hoes from 1807 until her death in 1819.
- Richard Mentor Johnson deemed the enslaved Julia Chinn to be his common-law wife until her death in 1830.
- Henry Wilson was married to Harriet Howe from 1840 until her death in 1870.
- William A. Wheeler was married to Mary King from 1845 until her death in 1876.
- Chester A. Arthur was married to Ellen Lewis Herndon from 1859 until her death in 1880.
- Charles Curtis was married to Annie Baird from 1884 until her death in 1924. Curtis's half-sister Dolly Gann acted as his official hostess for social events during his vice presidency.

Five U.S. vice presidents were widowed and remarried prior to their vice presidencies:

- Hannibal Hamlin was married to Sarah Emery from 1833 until her death in 1855. He was subsequently married to Ellen Emery, half-sister of his first wife, from 1856 to his death in 1891.
- Schuyler Colfax was married to Evelyn Clark from 1844 until her death in 1863. He was subsequently married to Ellen Wade from 1868 to his death in 1885.
- Levi P. Morton was married to Lucy Young Kimball from 1856 until her death in 1871. He was subsequently married to Anna Livingston Reade Street from 1873 to her death in 1918.
- Theodore Roosevelt was married to Alice Hathaway Lee from 1880 until her death in 1884. He was subsequently married to Edith Carow from 1886 to his death in 1919.
- Joe Biden was married to Neilia Hunter from 1966 until her death in 1972. He has subsequently been married to Jill Jacobs since 1977.

One U.S. vice president was divorced and remarried prior to his vice presidency:

- Nelson Rockefeller was married to Mary Todhunter Clark from 1930 until 1962. He was subsequently married to Happy Fitler Murphy from 1963 until his death in 1979.

One U.S. vice president was widowed before his vice presidency and remarried during his vice presidency:

- Alben W. Barkley was married to Dorothy Brower from 1903 until her death in 1947. He was subsequently married to Jane Rucker Hadley from 1949 to his death in 1956.

Three U.S. vice presidents remarried after their vice presidencies:

- Aaron Burr was married to Elizabeth Bowen Jumel from 1833 until their divorce in 1836.
- John Tyler was married to Julia Gardiner from 1844 until his death in 1862.
- Millard Fillmore was married to Caroline Carmichael McIntosh from 1858 until his death in 1874.

== See also ==
- First Lady of the United States (list)
- Vice President of the United States (list)
- United States order of precedence
