= Cornelia Cole Fairbanks =

Second Lady of the United States from 1905 to 1909

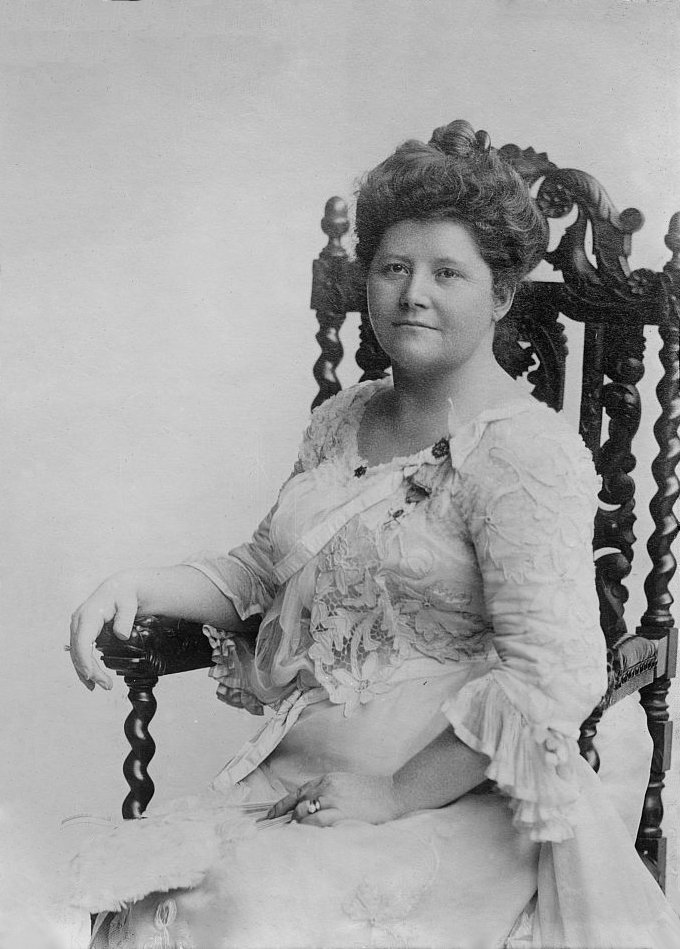

Second Lady of the United States
- In role March 4, 1905 – March 4, 1909
- Vice President: Charles W. Fairbanks
- Preceded by: Edith Roosevelt
- Succeeded by: Carrie Sherman

President General, National Society Daughters of the American Revolution
- In office 1901–1905
- Preceded by: Mary Margaretta Fryer Manning
- Succeeded by: Emily Nelson Ritchie McLean

Personal details
- Born: Cornelia Cole; January 14, 1852 Marysville, Ohio, U.S.
- Died: October 24, 1913 (aged 61) Indianapolis, Indiana, U.S.
- Resting place: Crown Hill Cemetery and Arboretum, Section 24, Lot 3; 39.8175875°N 86.1711419°W
- Spouse: Charles W. Fairbanks (m. 1874)
- Children: 5
- Education: Ohio Wesleyan University (BA)

Cornelia "Nellie" Cole Fairbanks (née Cole; January 14, 1852 – October 24, 1913) was the wife of Vice President Charles W. Fairbanks. During her husband's tenure she was the second lady of the United States from 1905 to 1909. She was a leader in the women's suffrage movement and considered a pathfinder to politics for American women in the 20th and 21st centuries.

== Early life and education, marriage and family ==
Cornelia Cole was born in 1852 in Marysville, Ohio, the daughter of Ohio State Senator Philander Cole and his wife, Dorothy (Witter) Cole. She attended the Ohio Wesleyan Female College, from which she earned an A.B. in 1872.

In 1874, she married Charles Fairbanks, whom she had met at Ohio Wesleyan while working for the school paper. They had four sons and one daughter:

- Robert Fairbanks (who attended Yale)
- Richard M. Fairbanks (who attended Yale and served as a captain in World War I)
- Adelaide Fairbanks (who married Dr. Horace Allen, a physician)
- Warren Charles Fairbanks
- Frederick Cole Fairbanks

Cornelia and Charles Fairbanks moved to Indiana where he began practicing law, and she read with him and assisted in his practice, eventually encouraging him to enter politics.

== Activities ==
She was one of the founders of the all-women's Fortnightly Literary Club in Indianapolis, serving as its first president between 1885 and 1888. She also served on the State Board of Charities during this period.

With her husband serving as a U.S. Senator beginning in 1897, the couple came to Washington, D.C. In 1899 she hosted a trip for the British and American Joint High Commission to Alaska. Fairbanks, Alaska was named in honor of her husband shortly thereafter.

Cornelia was elected President General of the National Society of the Daughters of the American Revolution (DAR) in 1901, and she served two terms in that capacity. During her tenure she helped raise funds to construct the society's Memorial Continental Hall in Washington. In 1907, her chapter of DAR was organized, with 28 charter members. She was active with the George Junior Republic movement.

After her husband left office, they traveled the world in 1910, including an appearance in King Edward VII's court. Her attire from this event is housed at the Smithsonian Institution. Fairbanks was a proponent of Protestant Christianity, and supported missionary work.

Fairbanks died of pneumonia, aged 61, in 1913. She was survived by her children, husband, and mother. She is buried alongside her husband, who would die in 1918, in Crown Hill Cemetery in Indianapolis, Indiana.

== Legacy ==
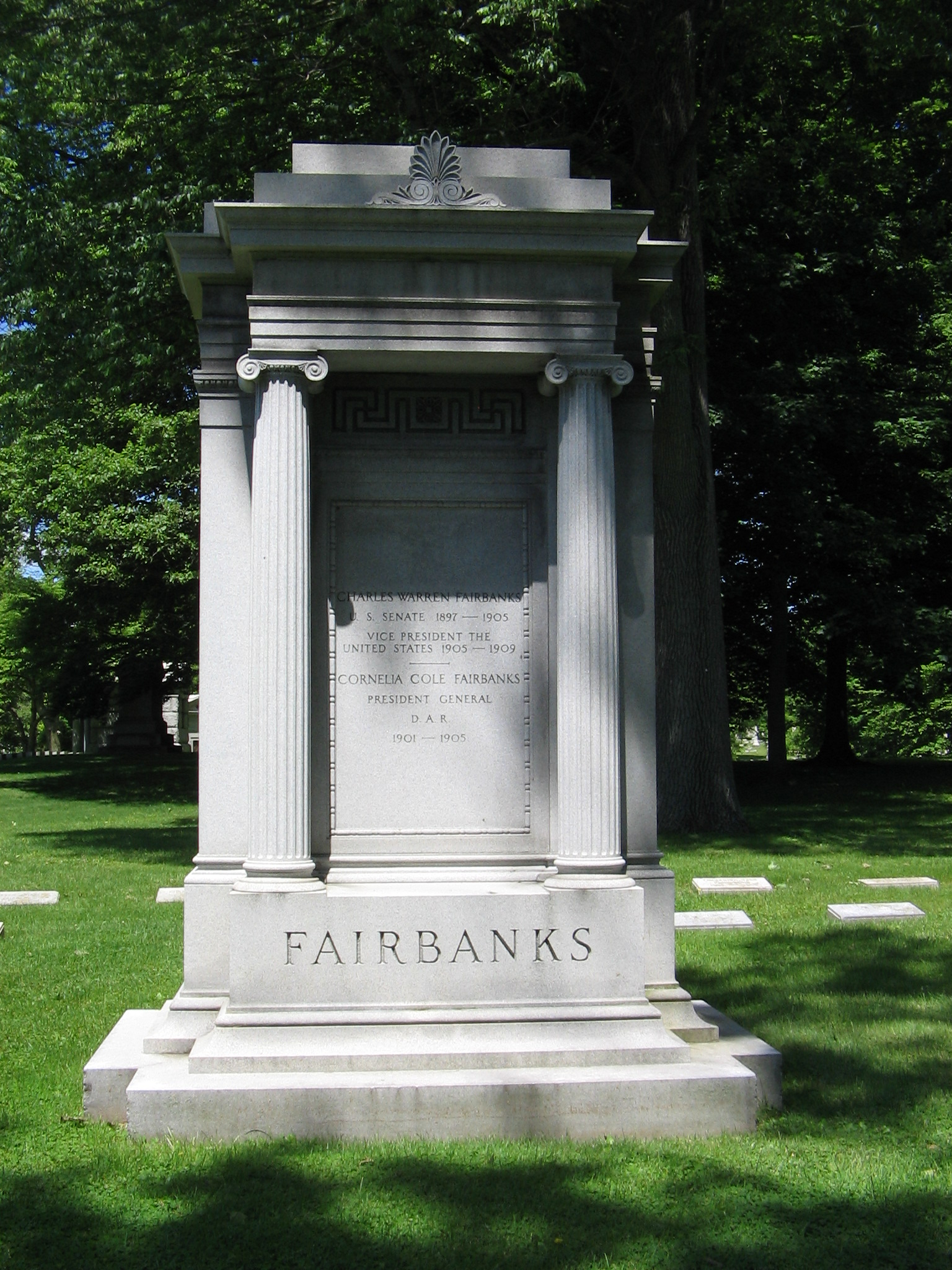
Fairbanks' grave in Crown Hill Cemetery Indianapolis, Indiana.

Cornelia Cole Fairbanks was considered a powerful progressive operative behind the political scenes, and helped pave the way for women leaders in the United States. She helped construct the second Women's Club in the United States in Indianapolis through her service on the national board of the General Federation of Women's Clubs. She was considered feminine, yet a suffragist and proponent of women's rights. Historically she is remembered as a pathfinder to politics for American women in the 20th and 21st centuries.

In her husband's will, he left funds for the Cornelia Cole Fairbanks Trust Fund, which helped create the Cornelia Cole Fairbanks Memorial Home, an alcohol addiction treatment center in Indianapolis.

Honorary titles
| Vacant Title last held by Edith Roosevelt | Second Lady of the United States; 1905–1909 | Succeeded by Carrie Sherman |
