= Lois Irene Marshall =

Second Lady of the United States

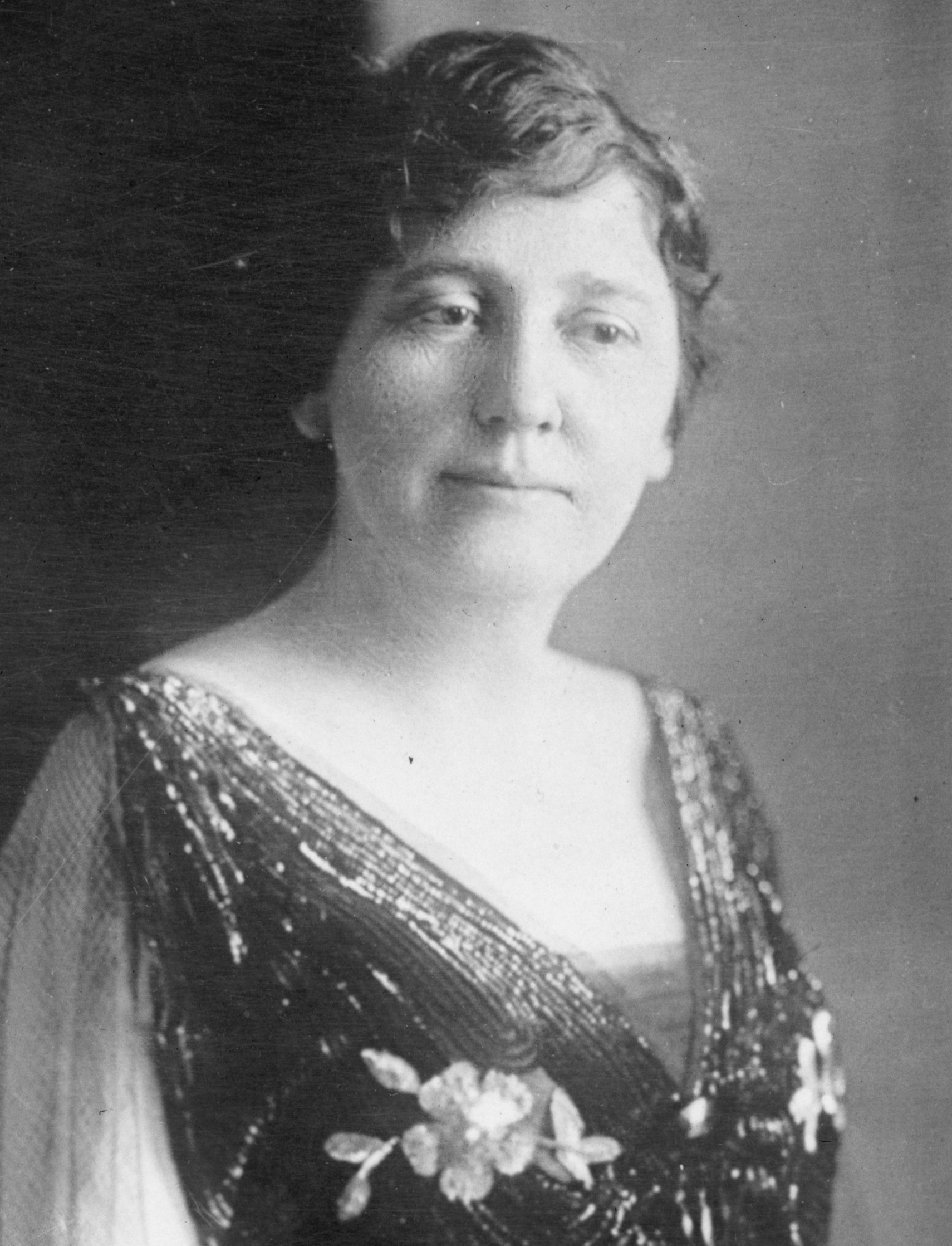

Second Lady of the United States
- In role March 4, 1913 – March 4, 1921
- Vice President: Thomas R. Marshall
- Preceded by: Carrie Sherman
- Succeeded by: Grace Coolidge

First Lady of Indiana
- In office January 11, 1909 – January 13, 1913
- Governor: Thomas R. Marshall
- Preceded by: Eva Hanly
- Succeeded by: Jennie Ralston

Personal details
- Born: Lois Irene Kimsey; May 9, 1873 Angola, Indiana, U.S.
- Died: January 6, 1958 (aged 84) Phoenix, Arizona, U.S.
- Resting place: Crown Hill Cemetery and Arborteum Sec 72, Lot 1; 39.8194807°N 86.17387°W
- Spouse: Thomas Marshall (m. 1895; died 1925)
- Children: 1 foster son

Lois Irene Marshall (née Kimsey; May 9, 1873 – January 6, 1958) was the wife of Thomas R. Marshall, the 28th vice president of the United States. During her husband's tenure she held the unofficial position of the second lady of the United States from 1913 to 1921. She served also as first lady of Indiana during her husband's Governorship (1909–1913).

== Biography ==
Lois Kimsey was the daughter of William Edward Kimsey and Elizabeth Dale. Lois married Thomas Marshall, 19 years her senior, on October 2, 1895.

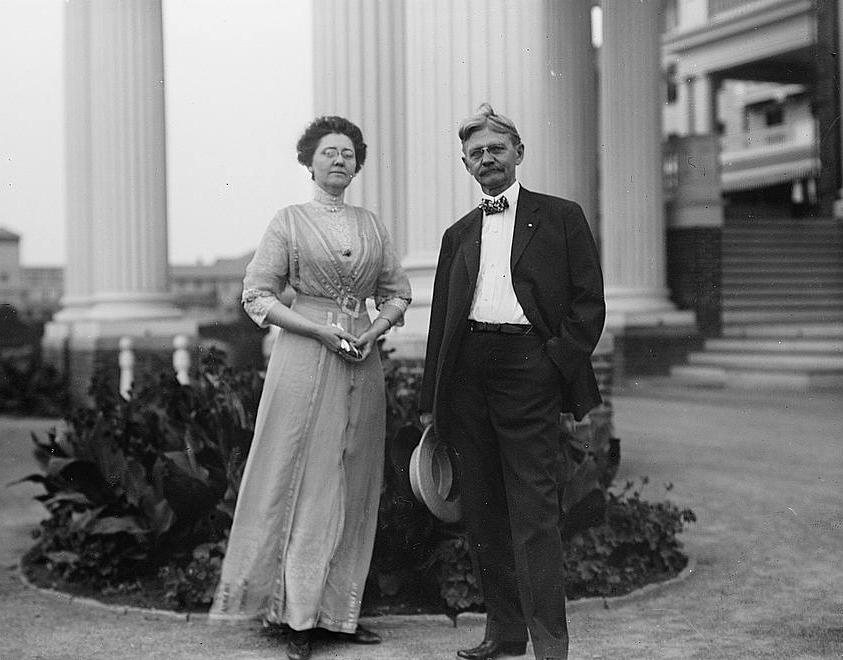
Lois Irene Marshall with her husband, Thomas R. Marshall, in Washington, D.C.

She became involved in charitable activities in Washington, D.C., and spent time working at the Diet Kitchen Welfare Center providing free meals to impoverished children. In 1917, she became acquainted with a mother of newborn twins, one of whom was chronically ill. The child's parents were unable to get adequate treatment for their son's condition. Lois Marshall formed a close bond with the baby, who was named Clarence Ignatius Morrison, and offered to take him and help him find treatment.

The Marshalls had been unable to have children, but they never officially adopted Morrison because they believed that to go through the procedure while his parents were still alive would appear unusual to the public. They instead made a special arrangement with his parents. Morrison lived with the Marshalls for the rest of his life. In correspondence they referred to him as Morrison Marshall, but in person they called him "Izzy". Lois Marshall took him to see many doctors and spent all her available time trying to nurse him back to health, but his condition worsened and he died in February 1920, just before his fourth birthday.

After her husband died in 1925, Lois moved to Phoenix, Arizona and lived on her husband's pension and the sales of his memoirs. She died at her Phoenix home on January 6, 1958, aged 84. She was interred next to her husband in Crown Hill Cemetery, Indianapolis, Indiana.

Honorary titles
Vacant Title last held by Carrie Sherman	Second Lady of the United States; 1913–1921	Succeeded by Grace Coolidge
Vacant Title last held by Eva Hanly	First Lady of Indiana; 1909–1913	Succeeded by Jennie Ralston
