= Caro Dawes =

Second Lady of the United States from 1925 to 1929

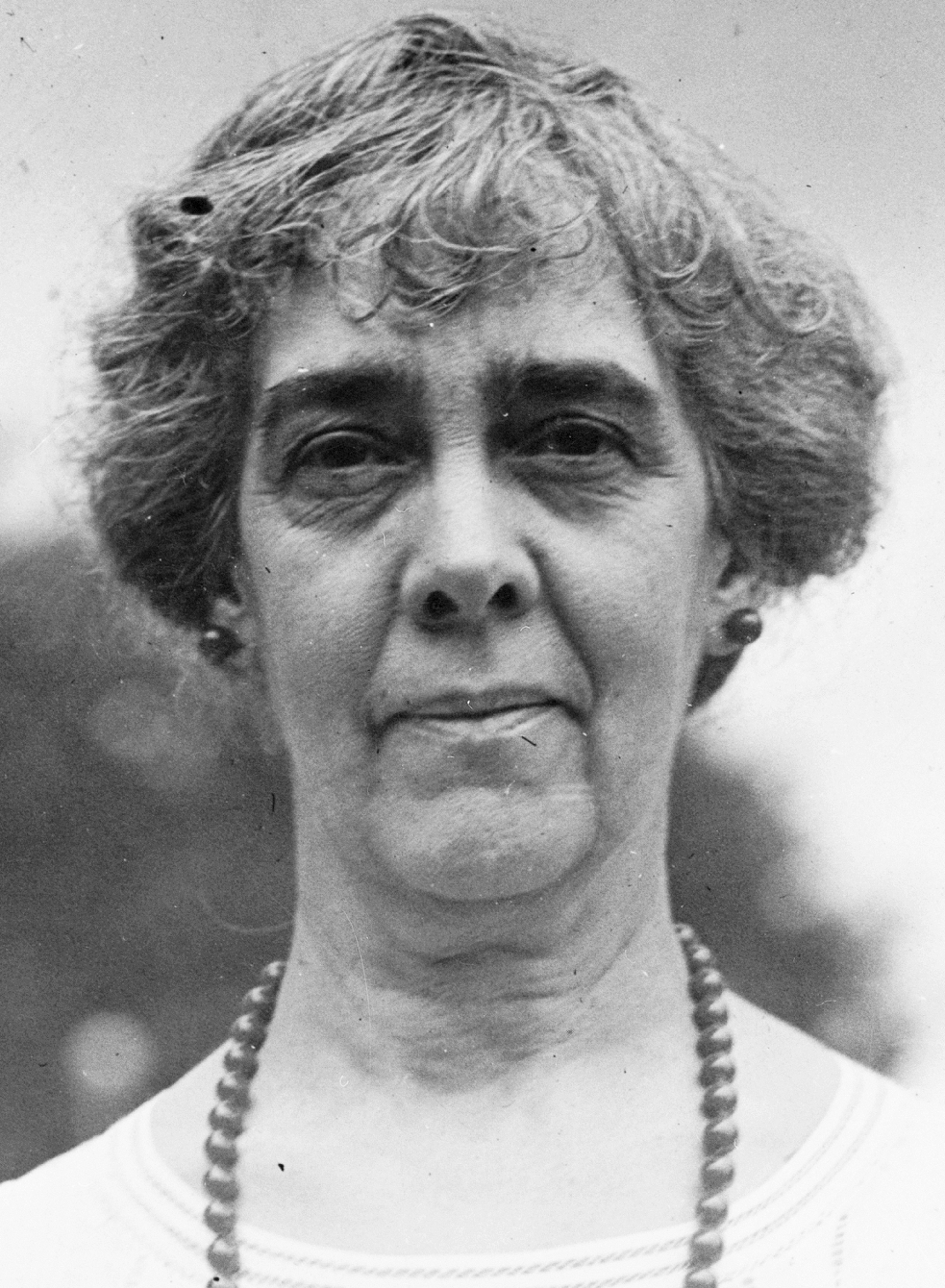

Second Lady of the United States
- In role March 4, 1925 – March 4, 1929
- Vice President: Charles G. Dawes
- Preceded by: Grace Coolidge
- Succeeded by: Mariette Garner

Personal details
- Born: Caro Dana Blymyer; January 6, 1865 Cincinnati, Ohio, U.S.
- Died: October 3, 1957 (aged 92) Evanston, Illinois, U.S.
- Resting place: Rosehill Cemetery
- Spouse: Charles G. Dawes (m. 1889; died 1951)
- Children: 4

Caro Dana Dawes (née Blymyer; January 6, 1865 – October 3, 1957) was the wife of U.S. Vice President Charles G. Dawes, and thus second lady of the United States from 1925 to 1929, during the Presidency of Calvin Coolidge. She was also a philanthropist, and worked with foster care and adoption organizations in Illinois.

== Early and private life ==
Dawes was born Caro Blymyer in Cincinnati, Ohio in 1865.

She married Charles Dawes on January 24, 1889. They had two biological children in 1890 and 1892 and adopted two more in 1912 and 1914. After the death of their son Rufus in 1912, the Daweses retreated from social life and instead devoted much of their energies to charity work.

== Career ==
During World War I, Dawes was involved in efforts to provide clothing to the 17th regiment of the Army Corps of Engineers, leading one newspaper to refer to her as "Mother of the Regiment".

In 1907, Dawes was elected vice president of the board of directors of the Illinois Children's Home and Aid Society (ICAHS), a network of foster homes for children in Illinois. In 1909, she became assistant treasurer of the organization, a position which she held for twenty years. In 1915, Dawes co-founded the Evanston Cradle, which coordinated adoptions of orphaned children.

While serving as Second Lady, Dawes disappointed some of the social elite of Washington, D.C. because she declined many social invitations, according to a 1928 report in the Morning Free Press. Nonetheless, it was observed that her "manner was sweet and gentle, her conversation cultured, and her dignity unimpeachable."

== Death ==
Dawes died in Evanston, Illinois on October 3, 1957, at the age of 92. She was buried with her husband in Rosehill Cemetery.

Honorary titles
Vacant Title last held by Grace Coolidge	Second Lady of the United States; 1925–1929	Vacant Title next held by Mariette Garner
