= James S. Sherman =

Vice President of the United States from 1909 to 1912

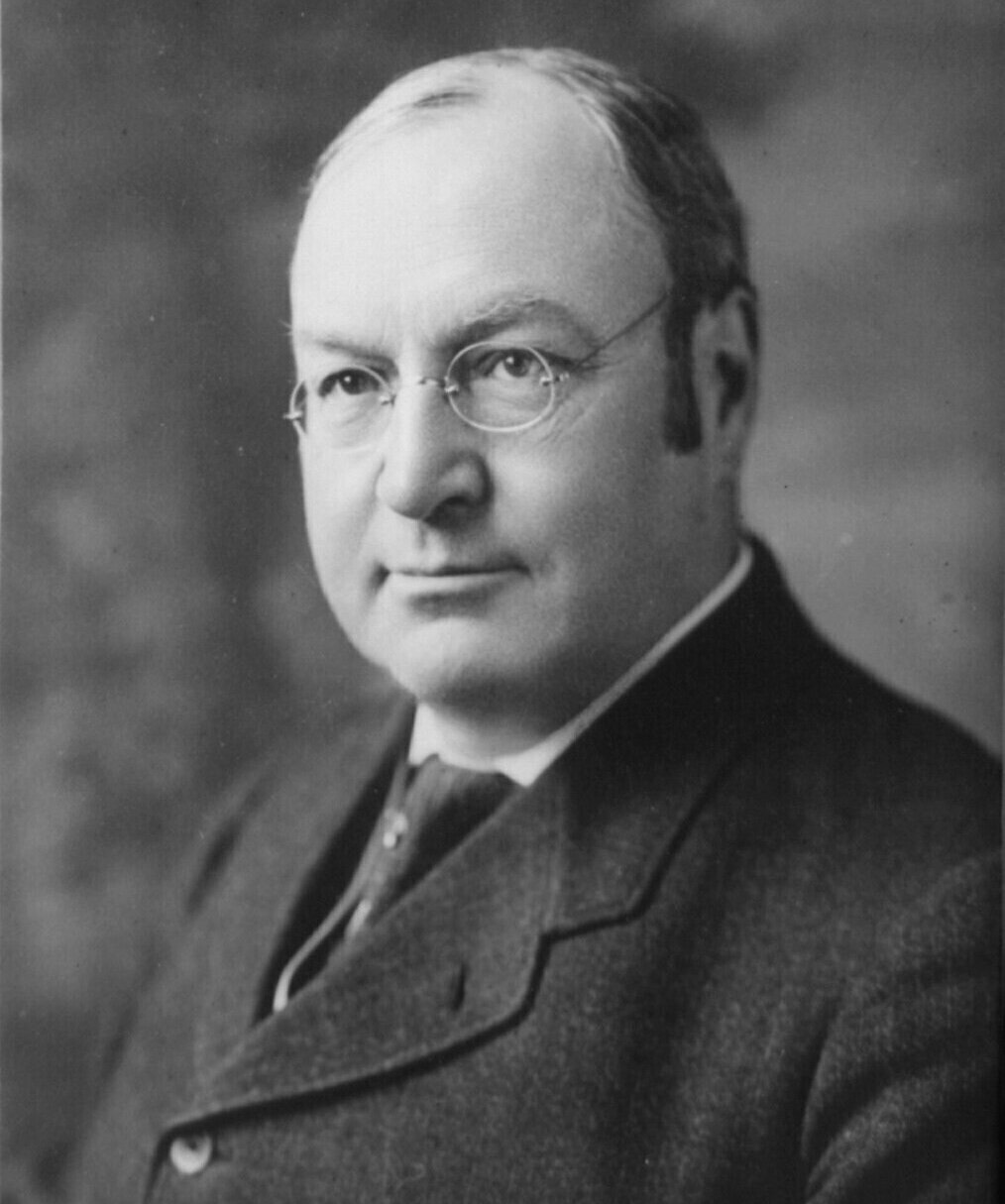
- Sherman in 1909

27th Vice President of the United States
- In office March 4, 1909 – October 30, 1912
- President: William Howard Taft
- Preceded by: Charles W. Fairbanks
- Succeeded by: Thomas R. Marshall

Member of the U.S. House of Representatives from New York
- In office March 4, 1893 – March 3, 1909
- Preceded by: James J. Belden
- Succeeded by: Charles S. Millington
- Constituency: 25th district (1893–1903); 27th district (1903–09)
- In office March 4, 1887 – March 3, 1891
- Preceded by: John T. Spriggs
- Succeeded by: Henry Wilbur Bentley
- Constituency: 23rd district

46th Mayor of Utica
- In office March 1884 – March 1885
- Preceded by: Charles Doolittle
- Succeeded by: Thomas E. Kinney

Personal details
- Born: James Schoolcraft Sherman; October 24, 1855 Utica, New York, U.S.
- Died: October 30, 1912 (aged 57) Utica, New York, U.S.
- Resting place: Forest Hill Cemetery
- Party: Republican
- Spouse: Carrie Babcock (m. 1881)
- Children: 3
- Parent: Richard U. Sherman (father)
- Education: Hamilton College (BA)
- Occupation: Attorney; politician
- Nickname: Sunny Jim

James Schoolcraft Sherman (October 24, 1855 – October 30, 1912) was the 27th vice president of the United States, serving from 1909 until his death in 1912, under President William Howard Taft. A member of the Republican Party, Sherman was previously a United States representative from New York from 1887 to 1891 and 1893 to 1909. He was a member of the interrelated Baldwin, Hoar, and Sherman families, prominent lawyers and politicians of New England and New York.

Known to his colleagues as "Sunny Jim", Sherman was recognized for his knowledge of parliamentary procedure. He was the first vice president to fly in an airplane (1911), and also the first to throw out the ceremonial first pitch at a baseball game. Sherman was the seventh and most recent vice president to have died in office.

== Early life and career ==
James Schoolcraft Sherman was born in Utica, New York, to Richard Updike Sherman and Mary Frances Sherman. Sherman was related to Roger Sherman, signer of the Declaration of Independence, and Union General William Tecumseh Sherman. He was educated at Whitestown Seminary, then attended Hamilton College, from which he received his Bachelor of Arts degree in 1878. (Note: Sherman received an honorary LL.D. from Hamilton College in 1903. He also received LL.D. degrees from Wesleyan University and the University of Pittsburgh.) At Hamilton, he was noted for his skills in oratory and debate.

After graduation, he studied law at Hamilton for a year before continuing his studies at the Utica office of Beardsley, Cookinham and Burdick. He was admitted to the bar in July 1880 and formed a law partnership with Cookinham under the name Cookinham and Sherman. Sherman was also president of the Utica Trust & Deposit Co. and the New Hartford Canning Company. Sherman became active in politics as a Republican and was elected chairman of the party in Oneida County. He was elected mayor of Utica in March 1884. In 1881, he married Carrie Babcock of East Orange, New Jersey. They had three sons: Sherrill, Richard U., and Thomas M.

== U.S. House of Representatives (1887–1891, 1893–1909) ==
Sherman was elected to the United States House of Representatives as a Republican in 1886 and served from March 4, 1887, to March 3, 1891. He lost his bid for reelection in 1890 but returned to the House in 1893, serving until March 3, 1909.

Sherman supported protective tariffs and the gold standard, opposing proposals for free silver. He supported the tariff policies of William McKinley and aligned with the conservative wing of the Republican Party.

During his House career, Sherman served as chairman of the Committee on Indian Affairs from the 54th through the 60th Congresses (1895 to 1909). Through Sherman's efforts in 1900, the Sherman Indian High School in Riverside, California was built and named after him.

Although Sherman did not chair Ways and Means or Appropriations, he frequently presided over the Committee of the Whole. This allowed the House to consider legislation with a smaller quorum and limits on debate before returning bills to the full House for a final vote. Henry Cabot Lodge praised Sherman's ability to preside over the committee.

== 1908 presidential election ==
Map of the 1908 Presidential Election

At the suggestion of Senator Charles Curtis at the 1908 Republican National Convention, Sherman was nominated as the Republican candidate for vice president on the ticket with United States Secretary of War William Howard Taft. Although not an obvious front-runner, he balanced the progressive Taft's profile, by being both an Easterner and a conservative (it was said that the two wings of the GOP 'flapped together'), and the New York delegates pressed hard for his nomination.

The Republicans won by a comfortable margin over the Democratic ticket of William Jennings Bryan and John W. Kern. At first, Sherman and Taft found themselves at odds over both tariff policy and the role of the Vice President. But as Taft became embattled with parts of the progressive faction of the Republican party, the two of them worked together more harmoniously—a relationship eased further by First Lady Helen Taft's enjoyment of the company of Sherman and his wife. The President declared that Sherman accomplished much on Capitol Hill by his "charm of speech and manner, and his spirit of conciliation and compromise", backed by a "stubborn adherence" to his principles.

== Vice presidency (1909–1912) ==
Sherman in life and death

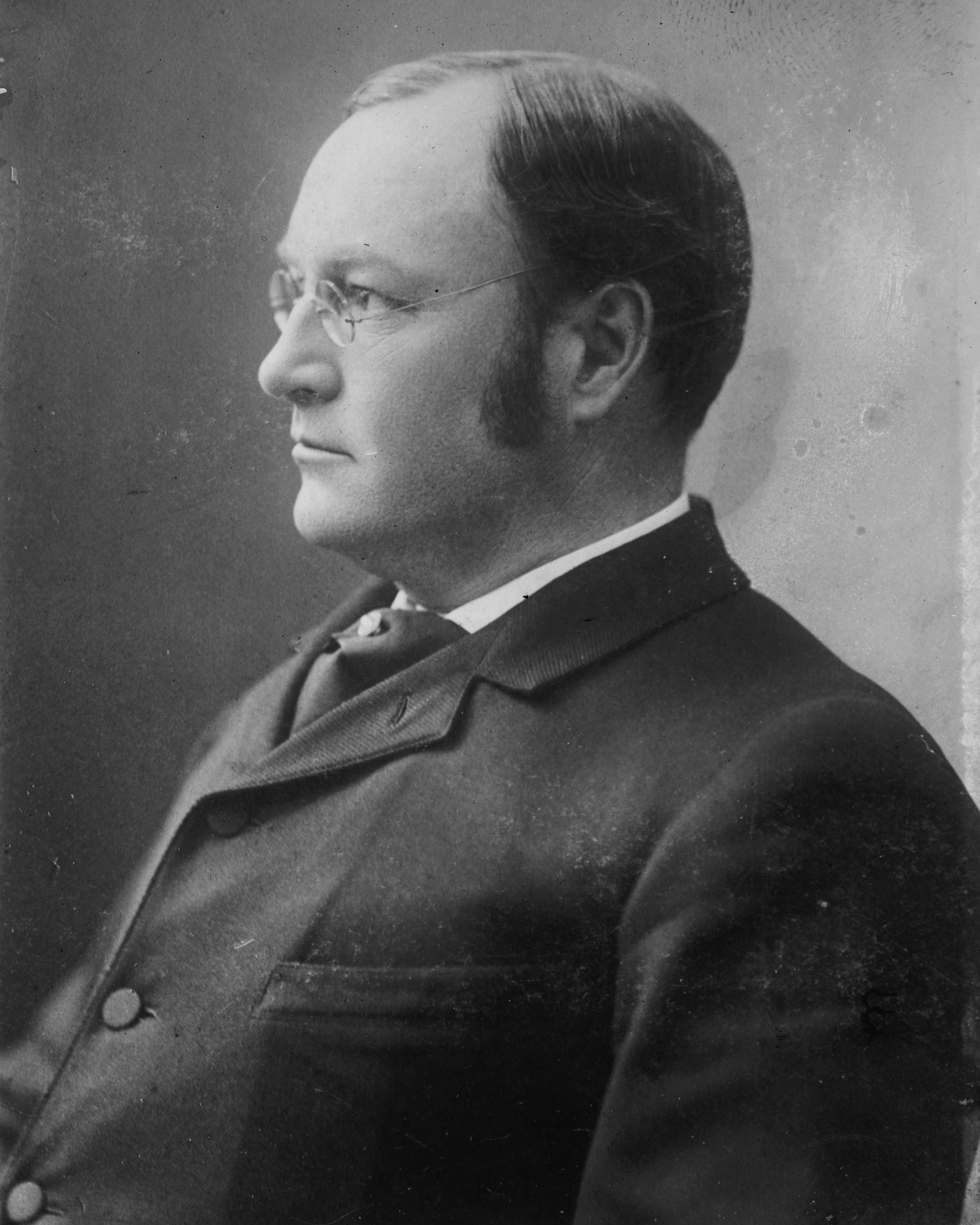
Undated photo by George Grantham Bain

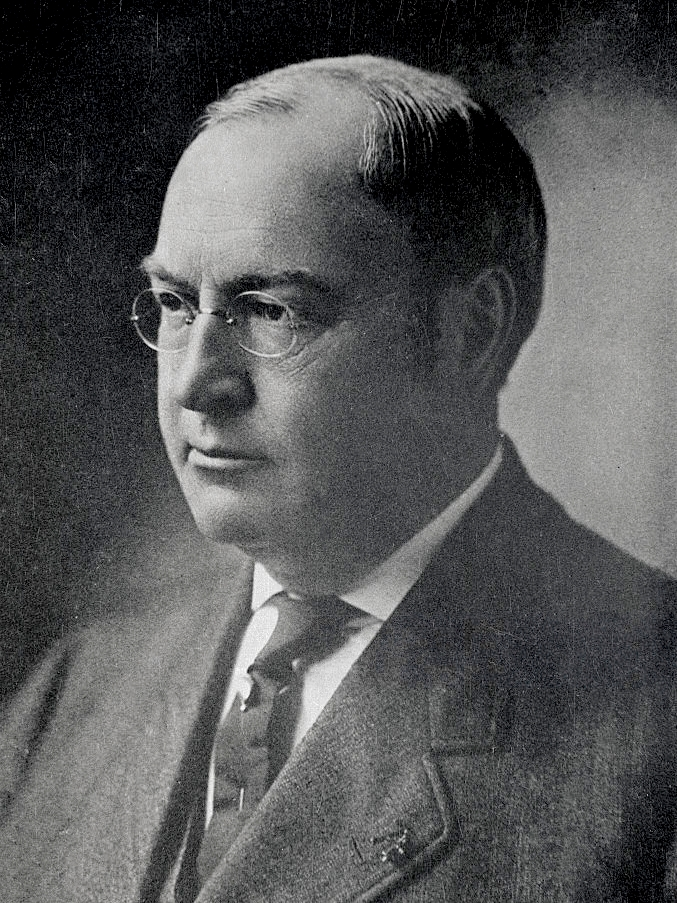
Sherman during his vice presidency

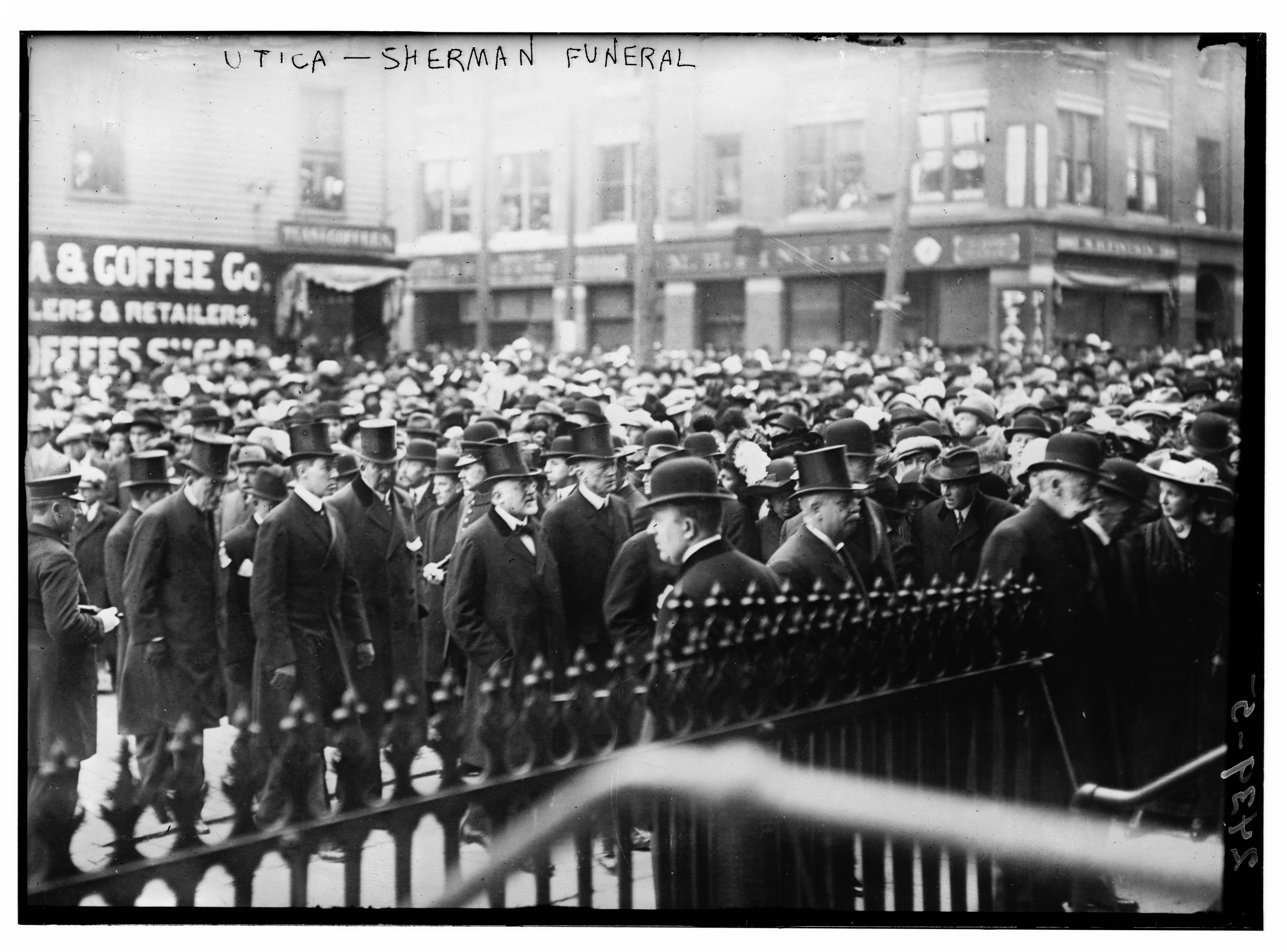
Mourners attend Sherman's funeral in Utica, 1912

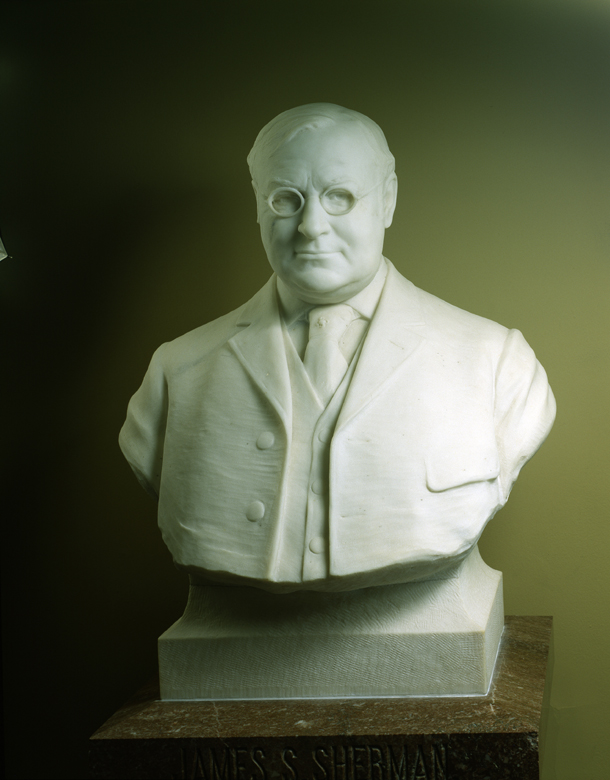
Bust of Sherman by Bessie Potter Vonnoh, 1911

Before taking office, Taft, who had been associated with progressives, asked Sherman to act as a liaison with the conservative Speaker Joseph Gurney Cannon. "I am going to rely on you, Jim, to take care of Cannon for me. Whatever I have to do there will be done through you," Taft said. Sherman replied, "Not through me. You will have to act on your own account. I am to be Vice President and acting as a messenger boy is not part of the duties as Vice President."

=== 1912 presidential election ===
Sherman was renominated as Taft's running mate at the 1912 Republican National Convention, becoming the first sitting vice president to be renominated since John C. Calhoun in 1828. After losing the Republican presidential nomination to Taft, Theodore Roosevelt ran as the candidate of the Progressive Party, dividing the Republicans. Sherman, who had suffered from Bright's disease since 1904, was too ill to campaign. This made re-election for the Republicans almost impossible, but Taft and Sherman remained on the same ticket in the 1912 contest, with New Yorkers once again supporting Sherman's nomination. Sherman died before the election.

== Death and funeral ==
Diagnosed with Bright's disease in 1904, Sherman's health was failing by the time of the 1912 campaign. Less than a week before the election, he died at home in Utica on October 30, six days after his 57th birthday, and President Taft was left with no living running mate. Sherman was buried at Forest Hill Cemetery in Utica.

After the election, Nicholas Murray Butler was designated to receive the electoral votes that Sherman would have received. Taft came in third place in the election, carrying only eight electoral votes from Utah and Vermont. Democratic candidate Woodrow Wilson and his running mate Thomas R. Marshall won the election while Progressive candidate Theodore Roosevelt and his running mate Hiram Johnson came in second place. The vice presidency remained vacant until Marshall's inauguration on March 4, 1913.

== See also ==
- 1908 United States presidential election
- 1912 United States presidential election

== Notes ==
U.S. House of Representatives
Preceded by John T. Spriggs	Member from New York's 23rd congressional district 1887–1891	Succeeded by Henry Wilbur Bentley
Preceded by James J. Belden	Member from New York's 25th congressional district 1893–1903	Succeeded by Lucius Littauer
Preceded by Michael E. Driscoll	Member from New York's 27th congressional district 1903–1909	Succeeded by Charles S. Millington
Party political offices
Preceded by Charles W. Fairbanks	Republican nominee for Vice President of the United States; 1908, 1912 (Deceased)	Succeeded by Nicholas M. Butler
Political offices
Preceded by Charles W. Fairbanks	Vice President of the United States; 1909–1912	Succeeded by Thomas R. Marshall
