= Ilo Wallace =

Second Lady of the United States from 1941 to 1945

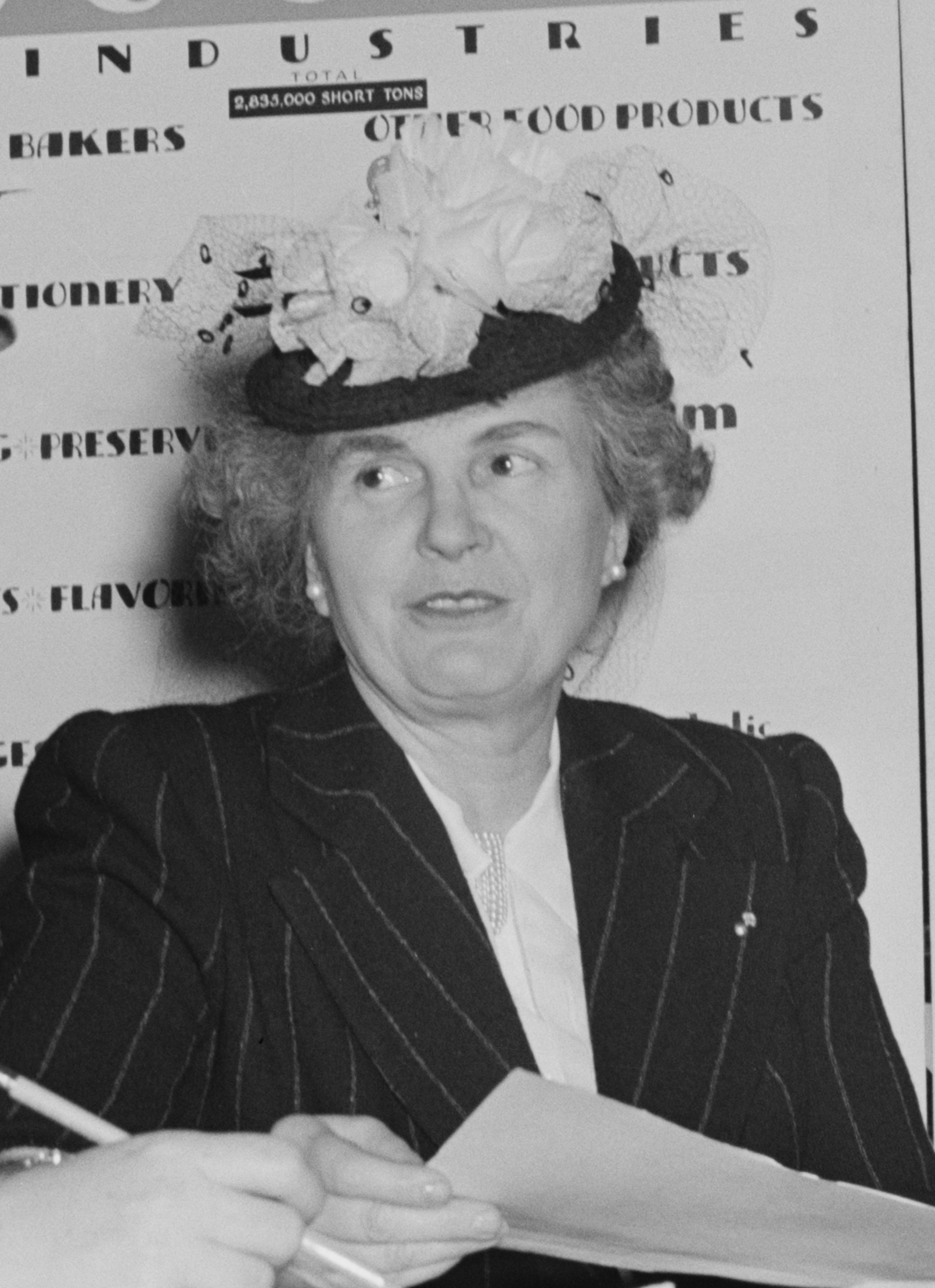
- Wallace in 1942 or 1943

Second Lady of the United States
- In role January 20, 1941 – January 20, 1945
- Vice President: Henry A. Wallace
- Preceded by: Mariette Garner
- Succeeded by: Bess Truman

Personal details
- Born: Ilo Browne; March 10, 1889 Indianola, Iowa, U.S.
- Died: February 22, 1981 (aged 91) South Salem, New York, U.S.
- Party: Democratic
- Spouse: Henry A. Wallace (m. 1914; died 1965)
- Children: 3
- Education: Simpson College; Drake University

Ilo Wallace (née Browne; March 10, 1889 – February 22, 1981) was the wife of U.S. vice president Henry A. Wallace and thus the second lady of the United States from 1941 until 1945. She was the sponsor of the battleship USS Iowa.

== Biography ==
Born in Indianola, Iowa, she was the daughter of James Lytle Browne and his wife, the former Harriet Lindsay. She attended Simpson College before transferring to study voice at Drake University.

She married Henry Agard Wallace in Des Moines, Iowa, on May 20, 1914. They had three children: Henry Browne Wallace (1915–2005), Robert Browne Wallace (1918–2002), and Jean Browne Wallace (1920–2011). Her husband later became the editor-in-chief of Wallace's Farmer, an influential Midwestern farming magazine that had been founded by his father, Henry Cantwell Wallace, who was the United States secretary of agriculture from 1921 to 1924.

A small inheritance she received from her parents enabled the Wallaces and their business partners to establish, in 1926, the Hi-Bred Corn Company, which developed and distributed hybrid corn and eventually transformed agriculture.

On February 22, 1981, aged 91, she died at the Wallace estate, Farvue Farm, in South Salem, New York. Her funeral was private at her family's request.

Honorary titles
Preceded by Mariette Rheiner Garner	Second Lady of the United States; 1941–1945	Succeeded by Bess Truman
