= USS Iowa (BB-61) =

Iowa-class battleship

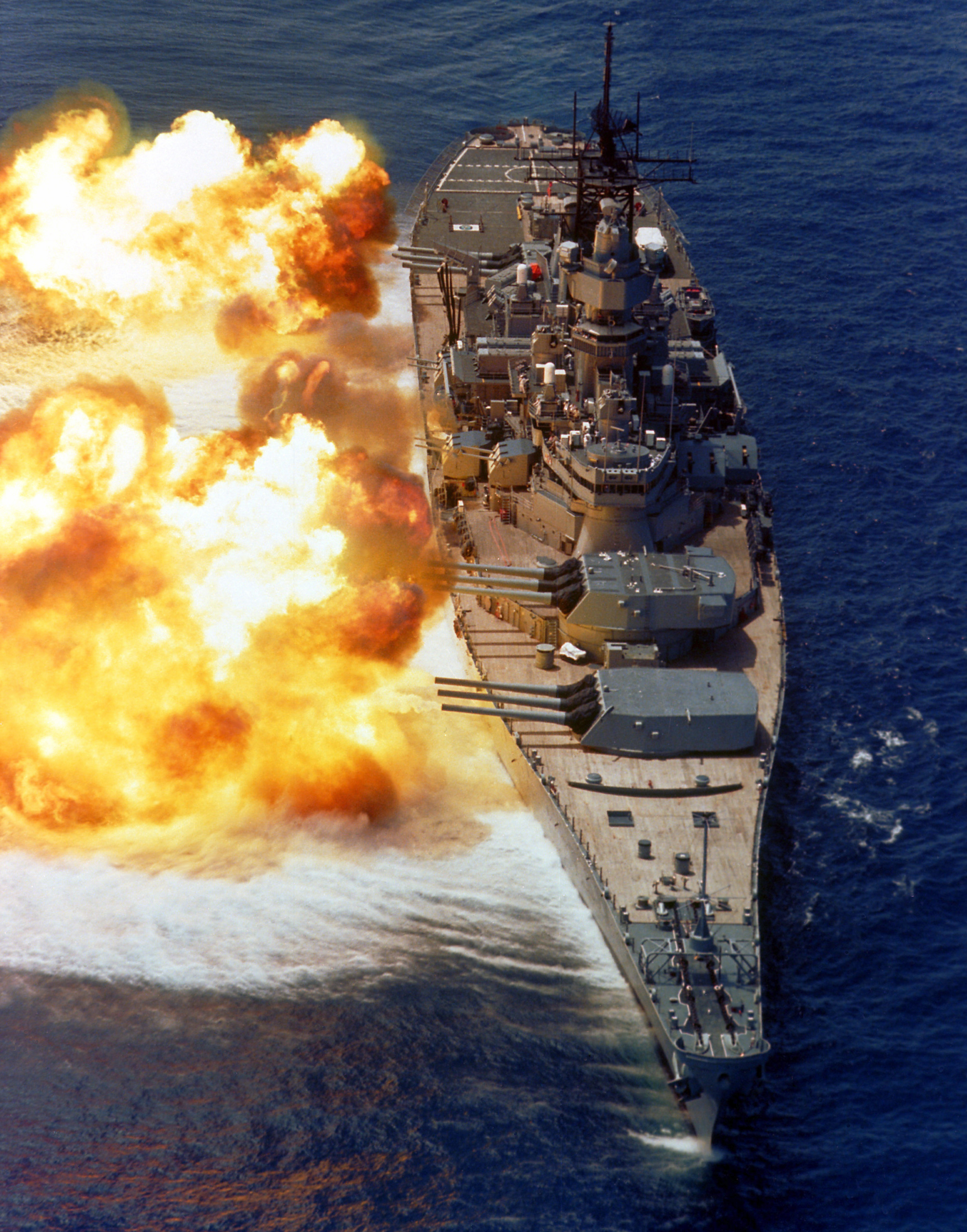
- USS Iowa unleashes a broadside of nine 16-inch guns on 15 August 1984 during a firepower demonstration after her modernization

History

United States
- Namesake: State of Iowa
- Ordered: 1 July 1939
- Builder: New York Naval Yard
- Laid down: 27 June 1940
- Launched: 27 August 1942
- Sponsored by: Ilo Wallace
- Commissioned: 22 February 1943
- Decommissioned: 24 March 1949
- Recommissioned: 25 August 1951
- Decommissioned: 24 February 1958
- Recommissioned: 28 April 1984
- Decommissioned: 26 October 1990
- Stricken: 17 March 2006
- Identification: Callsign: NEPM; Hull number: BB-61
- Motto: "Our Liberties We Prize, Our Rights We Will Maintain"
- Nickname(s): "The Big Stick" (1952), "The Grey Ghost" (Korean War), "The Battleship of Presidents"
- Honors and awards: 11 battle stars
- Fate: Museum ship
- Status: On display at the Pacific Battleship Center at the Port of Los Angeles (33.7423°N 118.2772°W)
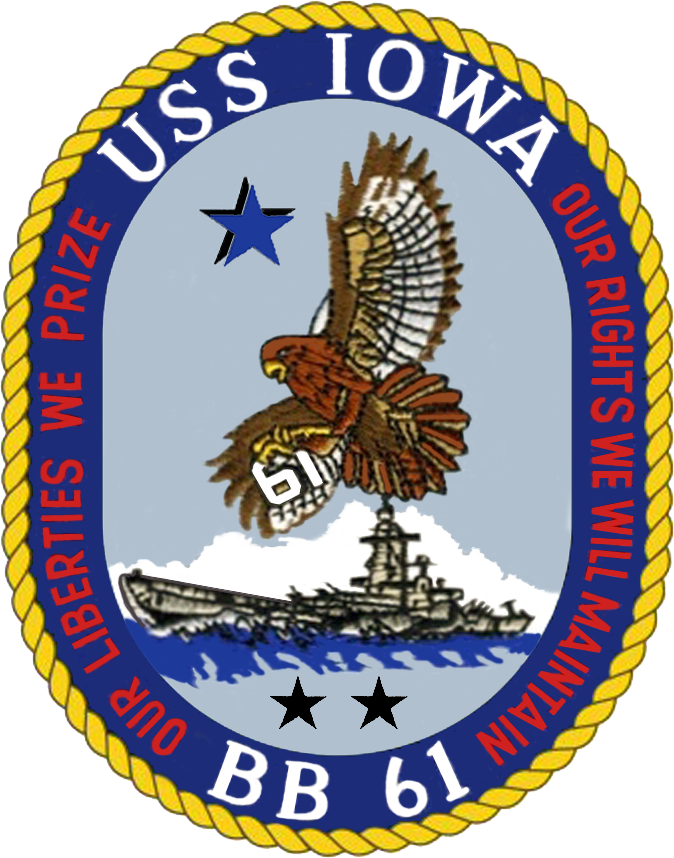
- Badge

General characteristics
- Class & type: Iowa-class battleship
- Displacement: 48,110 long tons (48,880 t) Standard; 57,540 long tons (58,460 t) full load
- Length: 887 ft 3 in (270.43 m)
- Beam: 108 ft 2 in (32.97 m)
- Draft: 37 ft 2 in (11.33 m) (full load)
- Installed power: 8 Babcock & Wilcox water-tube boilers; 212,000 shp (158,088 kW)
- Propulsion: 4 × steam turbines; 4 × screw propellers
- Speed: 33 knots (38 mph; 61 km/h)
- Complement: 151 officers, 2,637 enlisted (WWII)
- Armament: 1943: 9 × 16 in (406 mm)/50-caliber Mark 7 guns; 20 × 5 in (127 mm)/38 cal Mark 12 guns; 76 × 40 mm/56 cal anti-aircraft guns; 52 × 20 mm/70 cal anti-aircraft guns; 1984: 9 × 16 in (406 mm)/50-caliber Mark 7 guns; 12 × 5 in (127 mm)/38 cal Mark 12 guns; 32 × BGM-109 Tomahawk cruise missiles; 16 × RGM-84 Harpoon Anti-Ship missiles; 4 × 20 mm/76 cal Phalanx CIWS
- Armor: Belt: 12.1 in (307 mm); Bulkheads: 11.3 in (287 mm); Barbettes: 11.6 to 17.3 in (295 to 439 mm); Turrets: 19.5 in (495 mm); Decks: main 1.5 in (38 mm); second 6.0 in (152 mm)
- Aircraft carried: floatplanes, helicopters, UAVs

USS Iowa (BB-61) is a retired battleship, the lead ship of her class, and the fourth in the United States Navy to be named after the state of Iowa. Owing to the cancellation of the Montana-class battleships, Iowa is the last lead ship of any class of United States battleships and was the only ship of her class to serve in the Atlantic Ocean during World War II.

During World War II, she once carried President Franklin D. Roosevelt across the Atlantic to Mers El Kébir, Algeria, en route to a conference of vital importance in 1943 in Tehran with Prime Minister Winston Churchill of the United Kingdom and Joseph Stalin, leader of the Soviet Union. When transferred to the Pacific Fleet in 1944, Iowa shelled beachheads at Kwajalein and Eniwetok in advance of Allied amphibious landings and screened aircraft carriers operating in the Marshall Islands.

During the Korean War, Iowa was involved in raids on the North Korean coast, after which she was decommissioned into the United States Navy reserve fleets. She was reactivated in 1984 and assigned to the United States 2nd Fleet homeported in Norfolk, Virginia, as part of the 600-ship Navy plan and operated in both the Atlantic and Pacific Oceans to counter the recently expanded Soviet Navy. In April 1989, an explosion of undetermined origin wrecked her No. 2 gun turret, killing 47 sailors.

Iowa was decommissioned for the last time on 26 October 1990 after 19 total years of active service, and was initially stricken from the Naval Vessel Register in 1995, before being reinstated from 1999 to 2006 to comply with federal laws that required retention and maintenance of two Iowa-class battleships. In 2011, Iowa was donated to the Los Angeles–based nonprofit Pacific Battleship Center and was permanently moved to Berth 87 at the Port of Los Angeles in 2012, where she was opened to the public as the USS Iowa Museum.

== Construction ==
Ordered in July 1939, USS Iowa was laid down at New York Naval Shipyard in June 1940. She was launched on 27 August 1942, sponsored by Ilo Wallace (wife of Vice President Henry Wallace), and commissioned on 22 February 1943 with Captain John L. McCrea in command.

USS Iowa's main battery consisted of nine 16-inch/50-caliber Mark 7 guns, which could fire 2,700 lb (1,200 kg) armor-piercing shells 20 nmi (23 mi; 37 km). Her secondary battery consisted of twenty 5"/38 caliber guns in twin mounts, which could fire at targets up to 12 nmi (14 mi; 22 km) away. With the advent of air power and the need to gain and maintain air superiority came a need to protect the growing fleet of Allied aircraft carriers; to this end, Iowa was fitted with an array of Oerlikon 20 mm and Bofors 40 mm antiaircraft guns to defend Allied carriers from enemy airstrikes.

== World War II (1943–1945) ==
=== Shakedown and service with the Atlantic Fleet ===
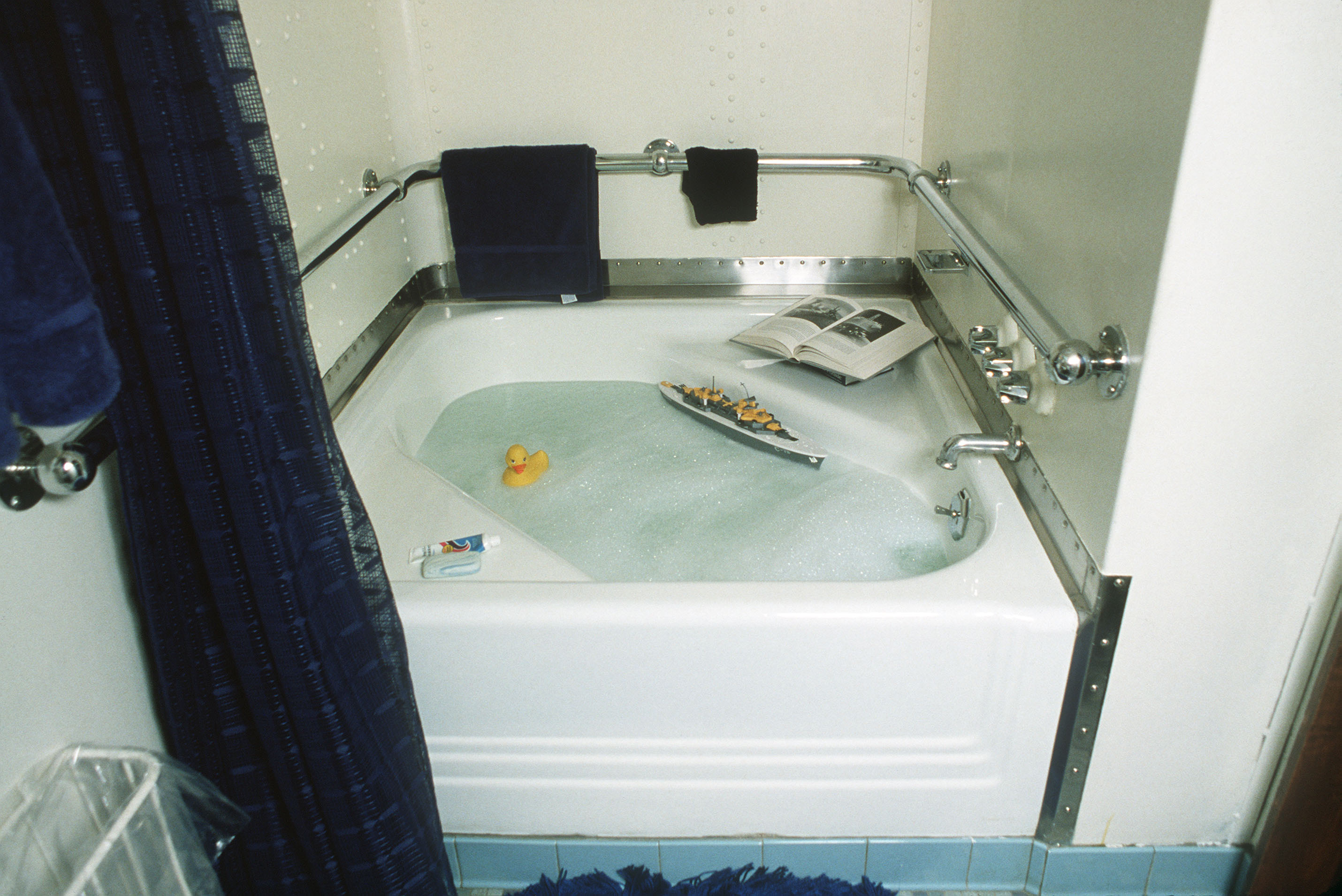
When Iowa was selected to ferry President Franklin D. Roosevelt to the Cairo and Tehran Conferences, she was outfitted with a bathtub for Roosevelt's convenience. Roosevelt, who had been paralyzed in 1921, would have been unable to make effective use of a shower facility.

On 24 February 1943, Iowa put to sea for a shakedown cruise in the Chesapeake Bay and along the Atlantic Coast. She got underway on 27 August for Argentia, Newfoundland, to counter the threat of the German battleship Tirpitz, which was reportedly operating in Norwegian waters, before returning to the United States on 25 October for two weeks of maintenance at the Norfolk Navy Yard.

In November 1943, Iowa carried President Roosevelt, Secretary of State Cordell Hull, Roosevelt's Chief of Staff Admiral William D. Leahy, Chief of Staff of the Army General George C. Marshall, Chief of Naval Operations Ernest King, Commanding General of the US Army Air Forces Henry "Hap" Arnold, Harry Hopkins, and other military leaders to Mers El Kébir, Algeria, on the first leg of the journey to the Cairo and Tehran Conferences. On 14 November, in waters east of Bermuda, USS William D. Porter, a destroyer that was part of Iowa's antisubmarine screen, accidentally discharged a torpedo toward Iowa during a drill. Following warnings from the destroyer and her own lookouts, Iowa turned hard to avoid the torpedo, which detonated about 1200 yards astern in the ship's wake. Iowa trained her guns on William D. Porter, concerned that the smaller ship might have been involved in an assassination plot.

Iowa completed her presidential escort mission on 16 December by returning the President to the United States. Roosevelt addressed the crew of Iowa prior to leaving by stating, "... from all I have seen and all I have heard, the Iowa is a 'happy ship,' and having served with the Navy for many years, I know—and you know—what that means." He also touched on the progress made at the conference before concluding his address with "... good luck, and remember that I am with you in spirit, each and every one of you."

=== Service with Battleship Division 7, Admiral Lee ===
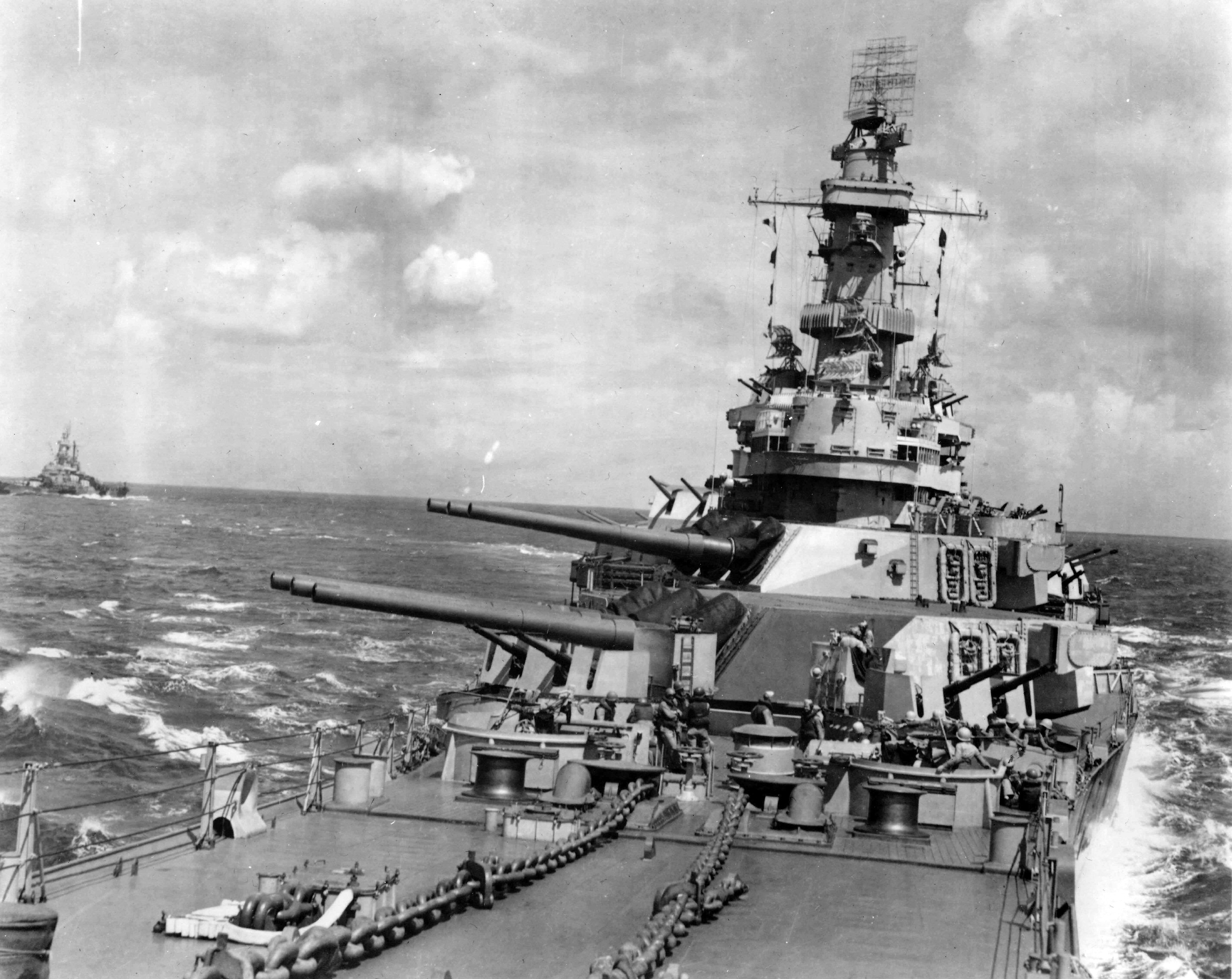
Iowa in the Pacific; Indiana can be seen in the distance.

As flagship of Battleship Division 7 (BatDiv 7), Iowa departed the United States on 2 January 1944 for the Pacific Ocean, transiting the Panama Canal on 7 January in advance of her combat debut in the campaign for the Marshall Islands. From 29 January to 3 February, she supported carrier air strikes made by Rear Admiral Frederick C. Sherman's Task Group 58.3 (TG 58.3) against Kwajalein and Eniwetok atolls. Her next assignment was to support air strikes against the major Japanese naval and logistics base at Truk, Caroline Islands.

==== Operation Hailstone ====
Iowa, in company with her sistership USS New Jersey, the heavy cruisers USS New Orleans and USS Minneapolis, and the destroyers USS Bradford, Burns, Charette, and Izard, was detached from the support group on 16 February 1944 to conduct an anti-shipping sweep around Truk during Operation Hailstone, with the objective of destroying enemy naval vessels escaping to the north. During the raid which destroyed Truk as a capable naval base, a raid by carrier aircraft attacked a group of Japanese ships consisting of the destroyers Nowaki and Maikaze, the training cruiser Katori, the armed merchant cruiser Akagi Maru, and the auxiliary submarine chaser Shonan Maru. Dive bombers sank Akagi Maru and disabled Maikaze, while torpedo bombers crippled Katori. Instead of another wave of aircraft, Admiral Spruance called off attacks to allow his surface force an action against enemy warships.

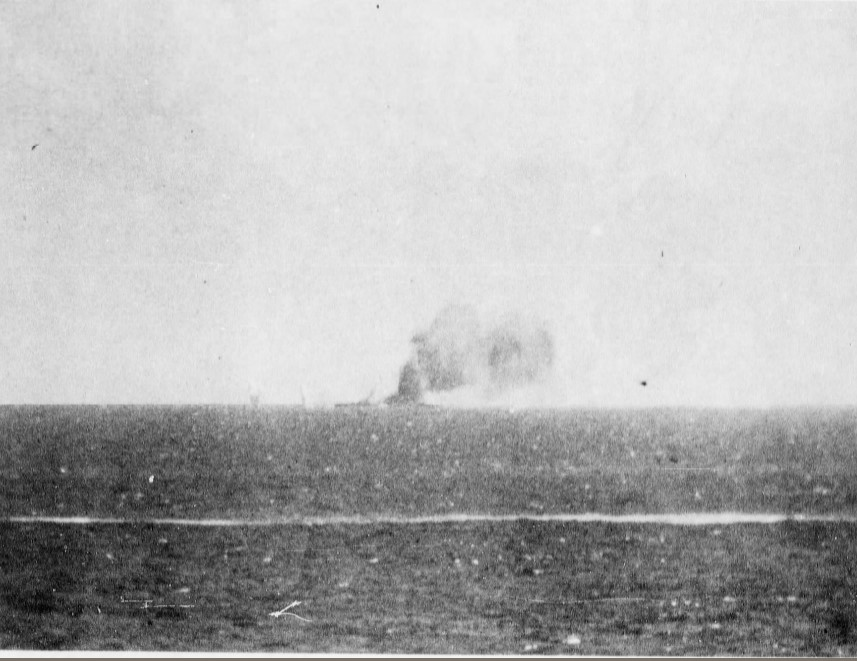
The Japanese training cruiser Katori under fire from Iowa, 18 February 1944

Several hours later, Iowa and her group of ships made contact with the Japanese group. Nowaki was towing Maikaze while Katori was straggling at 2 knots. At a distance of 14,500 yards, Iowa opened fire with her forward 16-inch (406 mm) guns on the limping Katori and after eight salvos, she struck the training cruiser with seven 16-inch (406 mm) shells below the waterline and nine 5-inch (127 mm) shells from her secondary battery—Katori responded with her own gunfire and a spread of torpedoes but to no use—which delivered the coup de grace. Over 11 minutes, Katori listed to port before she sank by the stern with the loss of all hands (315 men). This was Iowa's only sinking of an enemy ship, and the only instance of an Iowa-class battleship hitting an enemy vessel with its 16-inch (406 mm) guns.

In the meantime, the disabled Maikaze was dogpiled by New Jersey's secondary battery, New Orleans and Minneapolis, and Bradford, Burns, Charette, and Izard, and exploded and sank with all hands after a hail of 5-inch (127 mm) and 8-inch (203 mm) gunfire. In turn, Maikaze fired a spread of torpedoes that nearly hit New Jersey, but still missed. New Jersey, New Orleans, and Minneapolis then chased down and sank Shonan Maru with all hands. However, Nowaki was speeding away at full power to escape the American ships, which resulted in Iowa and New Jersey opening fire at 21,000 yards. Nowaki avoided being hit but was straddled several times. The pair then lost track of the destroyer as she disappeared off radar, but 10 minutes later discovered an "Aoba-class cruiser" at over 35,000 yards, which was actually the Nowaki continuing her escape. Iowa and New Jersey opened fire yet again and further straddled Nowaki in their first salvos, the longest ranged straddle in history. Nowaki suffered minor splinter damage with one killed and three wounded but escaped to fight another day.

On 21 February, Iowa was underway with the Fast Carrier Task Force (alternatively designated TF 38 while with 3rd Fleet and TF 58 while with 5th Fleet) while it conducted the first strikes against Saipan, Tinian, Rota, and Guam in the Mariana Islands. On 18 March 1944, Iowa, flying the flag of Vice Admiral Willis A. Lee (Commander, Battleships, Pacific), joined in the bombardment of Mili Atoll in the Marshall Islands. Although struck by two Japanese 4.7 in (120 mm) projectiles, Iowa suffered negligible damage. She then rejoined TF 58 on 30 March, and supported air strikes against the Palau Islands and Woleai of the Carolines for several days.

From 22 to 28 April, Iowa supported air raids on Hollandia (now known as Jayapura), Aitape, and Wake Islands to support Army forces on Aitape and at Tanahmerah and Humboldt Bays in New Guinea. She then joined the Task Force's second strike on Truk, on 29 and 30 April, and bombarded Japanese facilities on Ponape in the Carolines on 1 May.

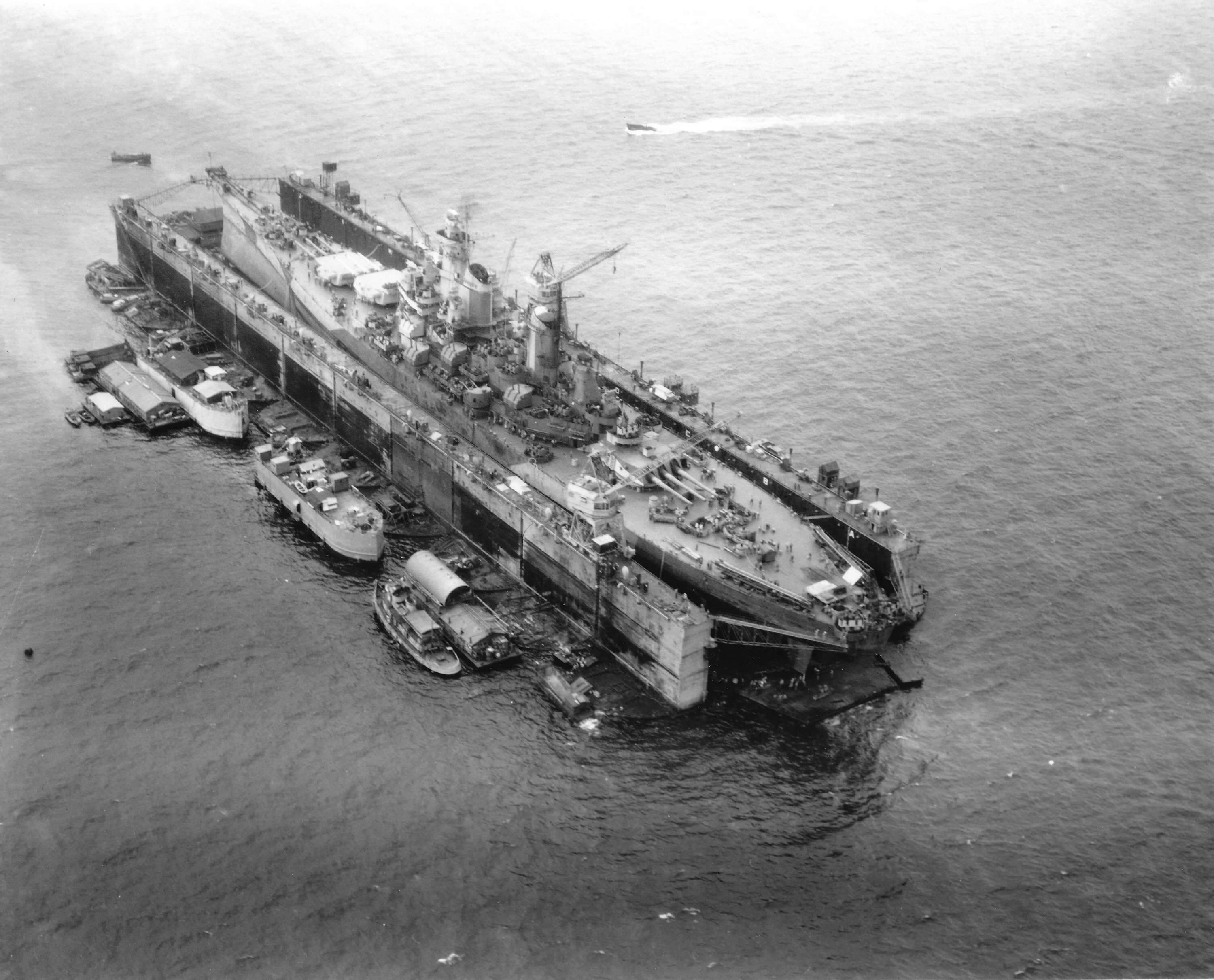
USS ABSD-2 repairing USS Iowa in early 1945 at Manus, Admiralty Islands

In the opening phases of the Mariana and Palau Islands campaign, Iowa protected the American carriers during air strikes on the islands of Saipan, Tinian, Guam, Rota, and Pagan Island on 12 June. Iowa was then detached to bombard enemy installations on Saipan and Tinian on 13–14 June, which resulted in the destruction of a Japanese ammunition dump. On 19 June, in an engagement known as the Battle of the Philippine Sea, Iowa, as part of the battle line of TF 58, helped repel four massive air raids launched by the Japanese Middle Fleet. This resulted in the almost complete destruction of Japanese carrier-based air forces, with Iowa claiming the destruction of three enemy aircraft. Iowa then joined in the pursuit of the fleeing enemy fleet, shooting down one torpedo plane and assisting in splashing another.

Throughout July, Iowa remained off the Marianas supporting air strikes on the Palaus and landings on Guam. After a month's rest, Iowa sailed from Eniwetok as part of the Third Fleet, and helped support the landings on Peleliu on 17 September. She then protected the carriers during air strikes against the Central Philippines to neutralize enemy air power for the long-awaited invasion of the Philippines. On 10 October, Iowa arrived off Okinawa for a series of air strikes on the Ryukyu Islands and Formosa. She then supported air strikes against Luzon on 18 October and continued this duty during General Douglas MacArthur's landing on Leyte on 20 October.

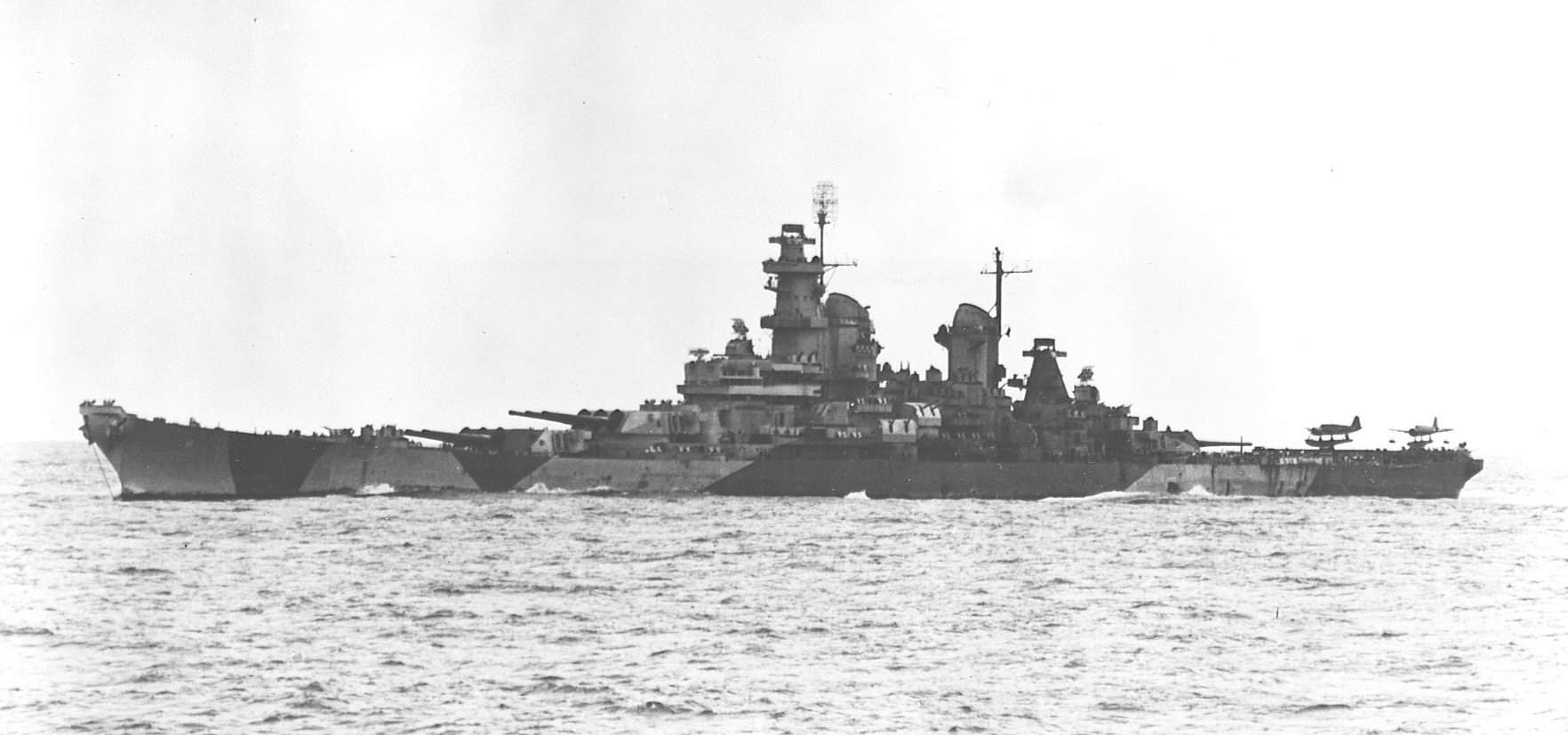
USS Iowa in World War II configuration and wearing Measure 32 Design 1B camouflage pattern, c. 1944

In a last-ditch attempt to halt the United States campaign to recapture the Philippines, the Imperial Japanese Navy struck back with Shō-Gō 1, a three-pronged attack aimed at the destruction of American amphibious forces in Leyte Gulf. The plan called for Vice Admiral Jisaburō Ozawa to use the surviving Japanese carriers as bait to draw US carriers of TF 38 away from the Philippine beachheads, allowing Imperial Japanese Admirals Takeo Kurita, Kiyohide Shima, and Shōji Nishimura to take surface task forces through the San Bernardino Strait and Surigao Strait, where they would rendezvous and attack the US beachheads. Iowa accompanied TF 38 during attacks against the Japanese Central Force under the command of Admiral Kurita as it steamed through the Sibuyan Sea toward San Bernardino Strait. The reported results of these attacks and the apparent retreat of the Japanese Central Force led Admiral William "Bull" Halsey to believe that this force had been ruined as an effective fighting group; as a result, Iowa, with TF 38, steamed after the Japanese Northern Force off Cape Engaño, Luzon. On 25 October 1944, when the ships of the Northern Force were almost within range of Iowa's guns, word arrived that the Japanese Central Force was attacking a group of American escort carriers off Samar. This threat to the American beachheads forced TF 38 to reverse course and steam to support the vulnerable escort carrier fleet, but fierce resistance by the 7th Fleet in the Battle off Samar had already caused the Japanese to retire and Iowa was denied a surface action. Following the Battle of Leyte Gulf, Iowa remained in the waters off the Philippines screening carriers during strikes against Luzon and Formosa. She sailed for the West Coast late in December 1944.

On 18 December, the ships of TF 38 unexpectedly found themselves in a fight for their lives when Typhoon Cobra overtook the force—7 fleet carriers, six light carriers, eight battleships, 15 cruisers, and about 50 destroyers—during their attempt to refuel at sea. At the time, the ships were operating about 300 mi (480 km) east of Luzon in the Philippine Sea. The carriers had just completed three days of heavy raids against Japanese airfields, suppressing enemy aircraft during the American amphibious operations against Mindoro in the Philippines. The task force met with Captain Jasper T. Acuff and his fueling group on 17 December with the intention of refueling all ships in the task force and replacing lost aircraft.

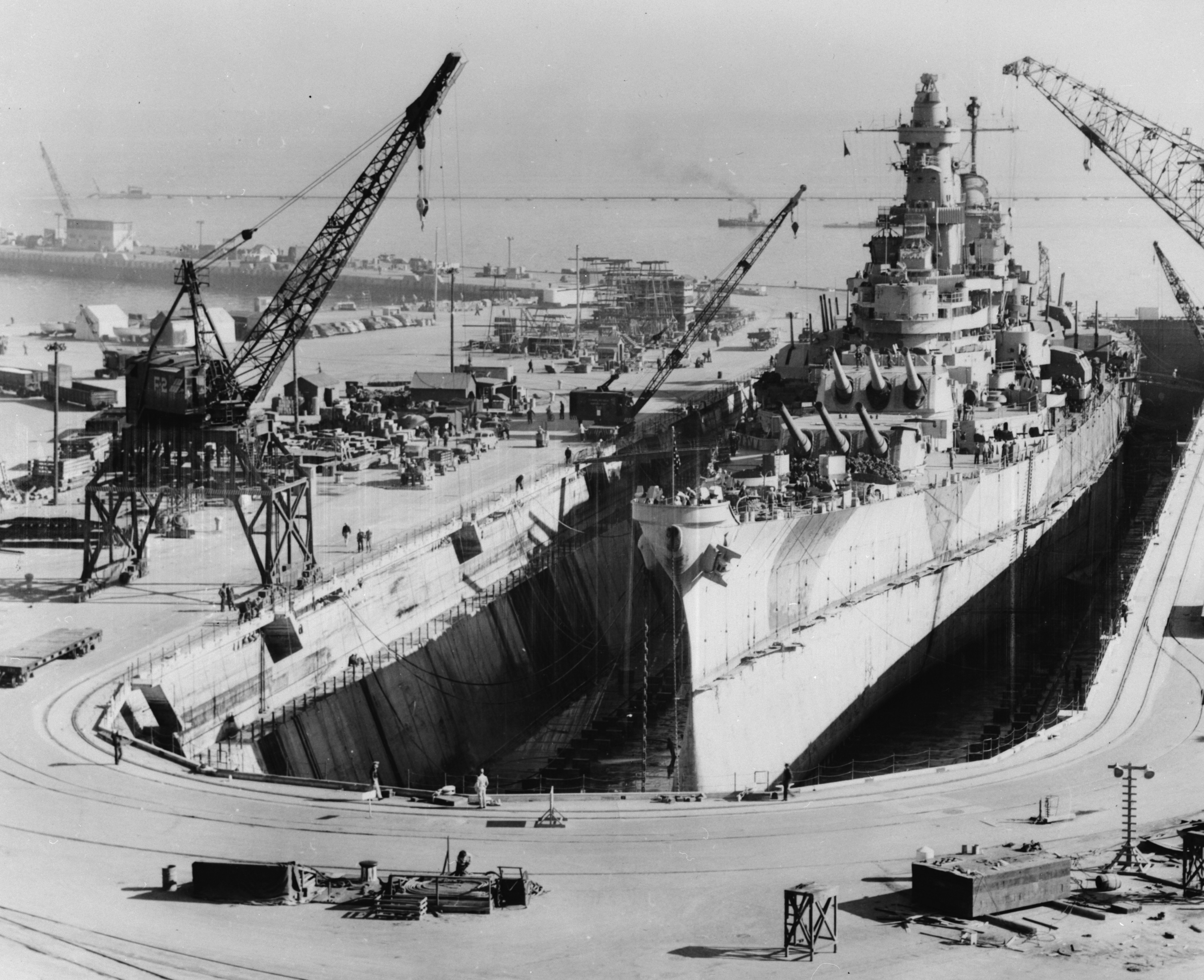
Iowa in drydock in San Francisco, undergoing repairs and modernization after being damaged during Typhoon Cobra

Although the sea had been growing rougher all day, the nearby cyclonic disturbance gave relatively little warning of its approach. On 18 December, the small but violent typhoon overtook the task force while many of the ships were attempting to refuel. Many of the vessels were caught near the center of the storm and buffeted by extreme seas and hurricane-force winds. Three destroyers—Hull, Monaghan, and Spence—capsized and sank with nearly all hands, while a cruiser, five aircraft carriers, and three destroyers suffered serious damage. Around 790 officers and men were lost or killed, with another 80 injured. Fires occurred in three carriers when planes broke loose in their hangars, and some 146 planes on various ships were swept overboard or damaged beyond economical repair by fires or impacts. Iowa reported zero injured sailors as a result of the typhoon, but suffered a loss of one of her float planes, and damage to one of her shafts. The damaged shaft required Iowa to return to the US, and she arrived at San Francisco on 15 January 1945, for repairs. During the course of the overhaul, Iowa had her bridge area enclosed, and was outfitted with new search radars and fire-control systems.

=== Bombardment of Japan ===
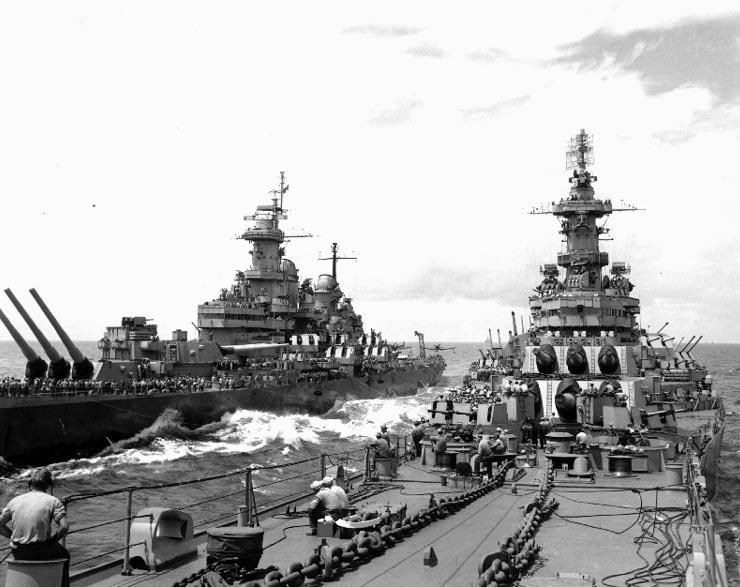
Missouri (left) transfers personnel to Iowa in advance of the surrender ceremony planned for 2 September

Iowa sailed on 19 March 1945 for Okinawa, arriving on 15 April to relieve her sister ship New Jersey. From 24 April, Iowa supported carrier operations, which aimed to establish and maintain air superiority for ground forces during their struggle for the island. She then supported air strikes off southern Kyūshū from 25 May to 13 June. Afterward, she sailed toward northern Honshū and Hokkaido, and participated in strikes on the Japanese home islands on 14–15 July by bombarding Muroran, Hokkaido, destroying steel mills and other targets. The city of Hitachi on Honshū was shelled beginning the night of 17 July and lasting to 18 July. On 29 and 30 July, Iowa trained her guns on Hamamatsu for a bombardment and continued to support fast carrier strikes until the cessation of hostilities on 15 August.

On 27 August, Iowa and her sister ship Missouri entered Sagami Bay to oversee the surrender of the Yokosuka Naval Arsenal. Two days later, she entered Tokyo Bay with the occupation forces. Here, a number of sailors from Missouri were temporarily stationed on Iowa for the duration of the surrender ceremony, which took place aboard Missouri. Iowa remained in the bay as part of the occupying force. As part of the ongoing Operation Magic Carpet, she received homeward-bound GIs and liberated US prisoners of war before departing Tokyo Bay on 20 September, bound for the United States.

== Post–World War II (1945–1949) ==
Iowa arrived in Seattle, Washington, on 15 October 1945, then sailed for Long Beach, California, where she engaged in training operations until returning to Japan in 1946 to serve as flagship for the 5th Fleet. She returned to the United States on 25 March 1946 and resumed her role as a training ship. During her usual routine of drills and maneuvers she also embarked Naval Reserve elements and midshipmen for training. In October, Iowa underwent a period of overhaul and modernization, which resulted in the addition of the SK-2 Radar and the loss of a number of 20 mm and 40 mm gun mounts. In July, following the Bikini atomic experiments, the old battleship Nevada was selected as a target for a live-fire exercise to be carried out by Iowa and other sea and air assets of the navy. The exercise began with separate shellings from a destroyer, heavy cruiser, and Iowa, but this did not sink the ship, so Nevada was finished off with one aerial torpedo hit amidships, sinking her 65 mi (105 km) from Pearl Harbor on 31 July 1948. In September 1948, as part of the post World War II drawdown of the armed forces, Iowa was deactivated at San Francisco, and then formally decommissioned into the United States Navy reserve fleets on 24 March 1949.

== Korean War (1951–1952) ==
In 1950, North Korea invaded South Korea, prompting the United Nations to authorize military intervention. President Harry S. Truman ordered US forces stationed in Japan to transfer to South Korea. Truman also sent US-based troops, tanks, fighter and bomber aircraft, and a strong naval force to the area to support South Korea. As part of the naval mobilization, Iowa was reactivated on 14 July 1951, and formally recommissioned on 25 August, with Captain William R. Smedberg III, in command. Iowa sailed for Korean waters in March 1952. On 1 April, she relieved her sister ship USS Wisconsin and became the flagship of Vice Admiral Robert P. Briscoe, commander of the Seventh Fleet. In her first combat operation of the Korean War, Iowa fired her main guns near Wonsan–Sŏngjin on 8 April 1952, with the goal of striking North Korean supply lines. In the company of other naval vessels, Iowa again engaged North Korean forces the following day, this time against enemy troop concentrations, supply areas, and suspected gun positions in and around Suwon Dan and Kojo. In support of South Korea's I Corps, Iowa shelled enemy positions on 13 April, killing 100 enemy soldiers, destroying six gun emplacements, and wrecking a division headquarters. The next day, she entered Wonsan Harbor and shelled warehouses, observation posts, and railroad marshaling yards before moving out to rejoin the UN flotilla aiding ground forces around Kosong. On 20 April, in her first combat action above the 38th parallel, Iowa shelled railroad lines at Tanchon, where four railroad tunnels were destroyed, before sailing to Chindong and Kosong for a two-day bombardment of North Korean positions.

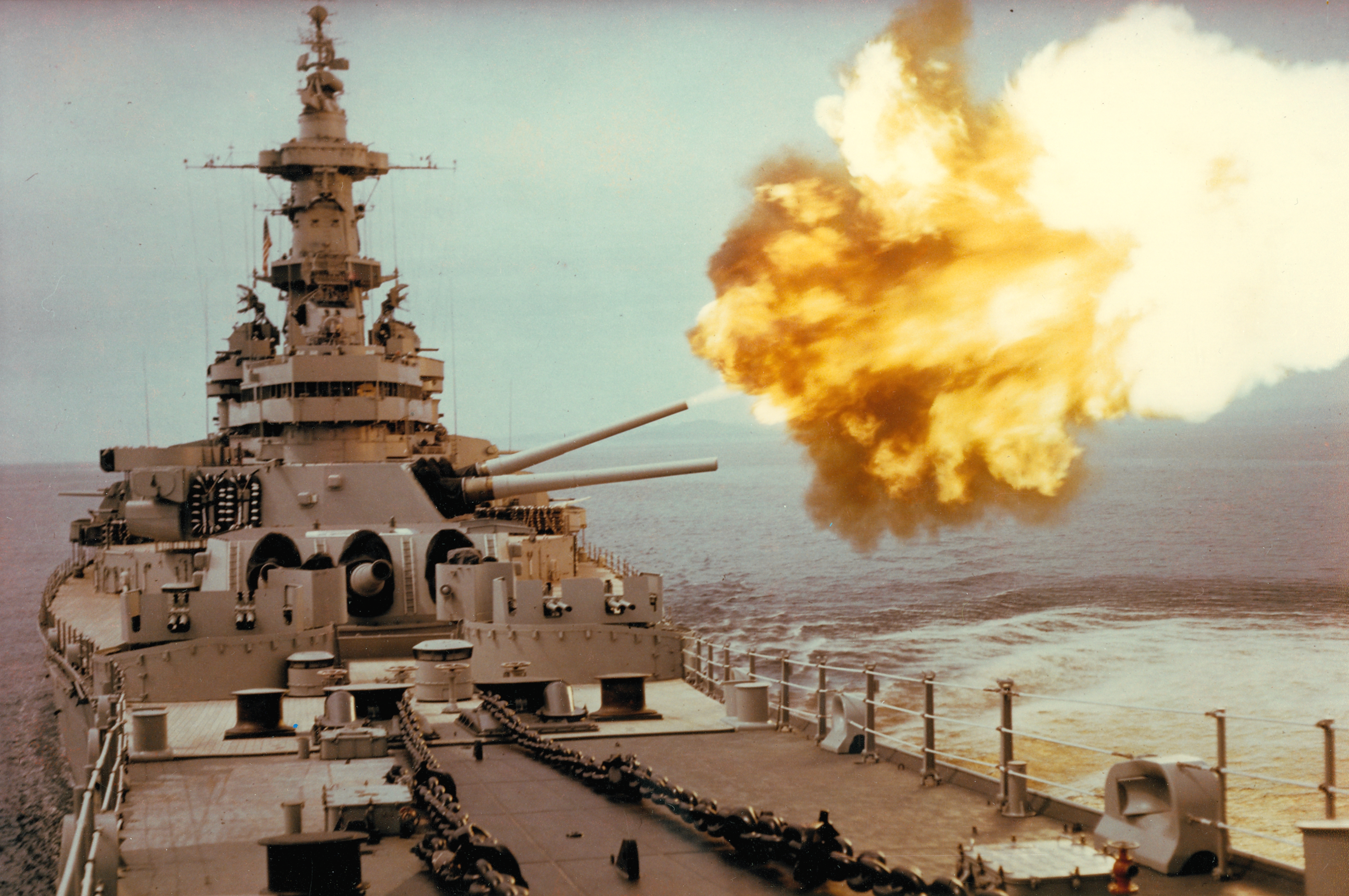
USS Iowa fires a 16 in (406 mm) shell towards a North Korean target in 1952

On 25 May Iowa, following her sister ship Missouri's example, arrived in the waters off Chongjin, a North Korean industrial center about 48 nmi (55 mi; 89 km) from the Russian border. Upon arrival, Iowa proceeded to shell the industrial and rail transportation centers in Chongjin, after which she moved south to aid the US X Corps. En route to US positions, Iowa again bombarded Sŏngjin, destroying several railroad tunnels and bridges in the area. On 28 May, Iowa rejoined the main body of the US fleet supporting the X Corps, heavily shelling several islands in Wonsan Harbor.

Throughout June, Iowa trained her guns on targets at Mayang-do, Tanchon, Chongjin, Chodo–Sokcho, and the ports of Hŭngnam and Wonsan in support of the UN and South Korean forces. On 9 June, a helicopter from Iowa rescued a downed pilot from the carrier USS Princeton. At the time, Princeton was operating with TF 77, and with other carriers in the task force that were involved in a bombing campaign against North Korean supply lines, troop concentrations, and infrastructure; additionally, the carriers were flying close air support missions for ground forces fighting against the North Korean forces. In July, Iowa received a new skipper, Captain Joshua W. Cooper, who assumed command of the battleship for the remainder of her Korean War tour.

On 20 August, Iowa took aboard nine wounded men from the destroyer USS Thompson after Thompson was hit by a Chinese artillery battery while shelling enemy positions at Sŏngjin. At the time, Iowa was operating 16 mi (26 km) south of Sŏngjin, and after receiving the wounded destroyer crewmen, Iowa covered Thompson as she retreated into safer waters.

On 23 September, General Mark W. Clark, the commander-in-chief of United Nations Forces in Korea, came aboard Iowa. Clark observed Iowa in action as her guns shelled the Wonsan area for a third time, accounting for the destruction of a major enemy ammunition dump. On 25 September, Iowa fired her guns at an enemy railroad and 30-car train. The following month, Iowa was part of the force involved in Operation Decoy, a feint to draw enemy troops into Kojo and bring them within striking distance of the battleships' big guns. During the operation, Iowa provided antiaircraft support to USS Mount McKinley, an amphibious force command ship.

In October 1952, Iowa was serving as flagship for the Commander, Seventh Fleet, and she engaged in 43 gun strikes on targets in the areas of Wonsan, Songjin, Kojo, Chaho, Toejo, Simpo, Hungnam, and northern Inchon, North Korea, and in 27 bombline operations. During these operations, 16,689 rounds were fired from her main and secondary batteries on enemy installations. This action established eligibility for the United Nations Service Medal and the Korean Service Medal with one bronze star.

=== Post–Korean War (1953–1958) ===
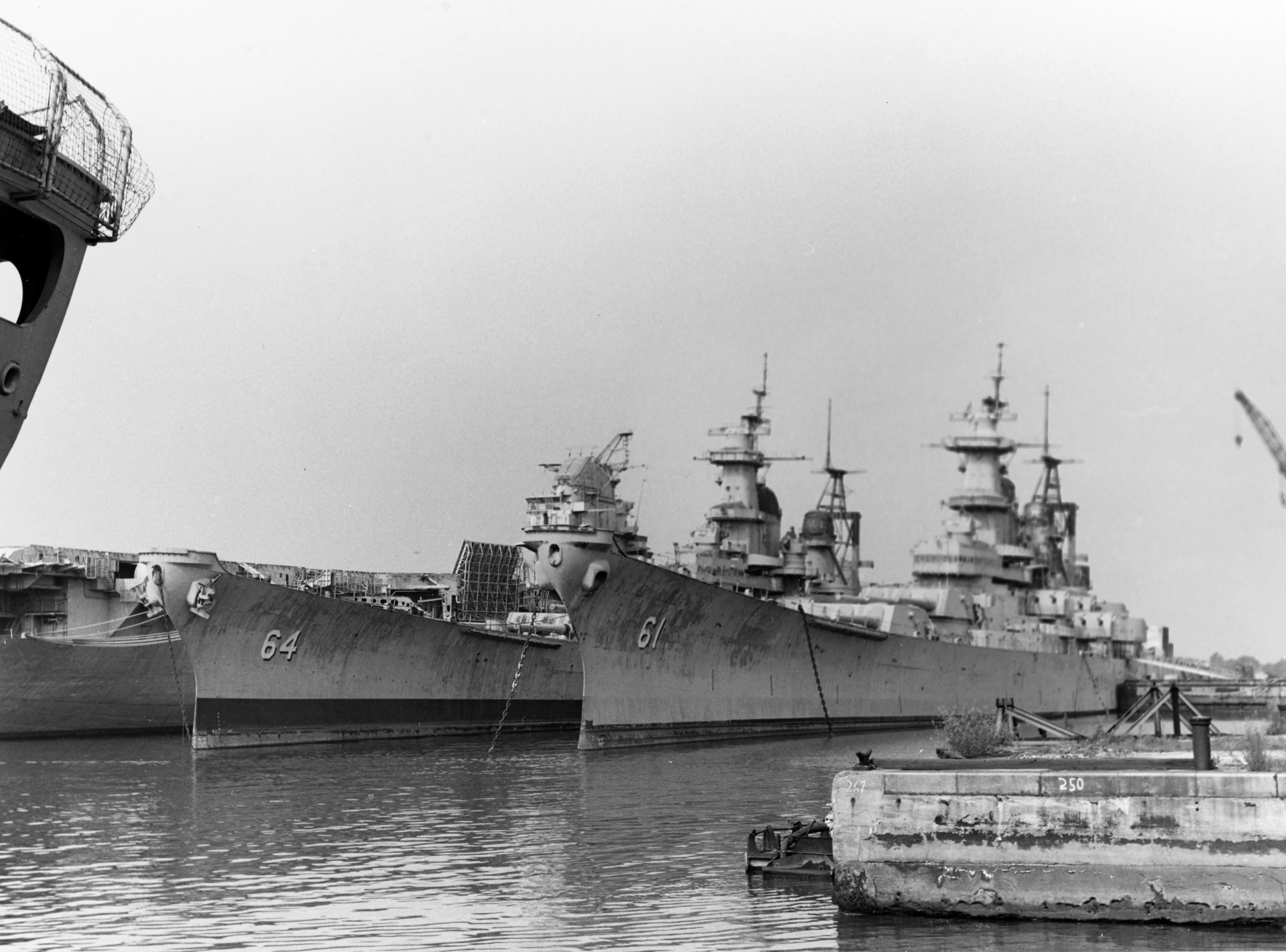
USS Iowa laid up alongside USS Wisconsin and USS Shangri-La in Philadelphia, 8 July 1978

Iowa embarked midshipmen for at-sea training to Northern Europe in July 1953, and shortly afterwards took part in Operation Mariner, a major NATO exercise, serving as flagship of Vice Admiral Edmund T. Wooldridge, commander of the 2nd Fleet. Upon completion of this exercise, Iowa operated in the Virginia Capes area. Later, in September 1954, she became the flagship of Rear Admiral R. E. Libby, Commander, Battleship Cruiser Force, United States Atlantic Fleet.

From January–April 1955, Iowa made an extended cruise to the Mediterranean Sea as the flagship of the commander, 6th Fleet. She departed on a midshipman-training cruise on 1 June, and upon her return entered Norfolk for a four-month overhaul. Afterward, Iowa continued intermittent training cruises and operational exercises, until 4 January 1957, when she departed Norfolk for duty with the 6th Fleet in the Mediterranean. Upon completion, Iowa embarked midshipmen for a South American training cruise and joined in the International Naval Review off Hampton Roads, Virginia, on 13 June.

On 3 September, Iowa sailed for Scotland for NATO's Exercise Strikeback. She returned to Norfolk on 28 September, and departed Hampton Roads for the Philadelphia Naval Shipyard on 22 October. She was decommissioned on 24 February 1958 and entered the Atlantic Reserve Fleet at Philadelphia.

== Reactivation (1982–1990) ==
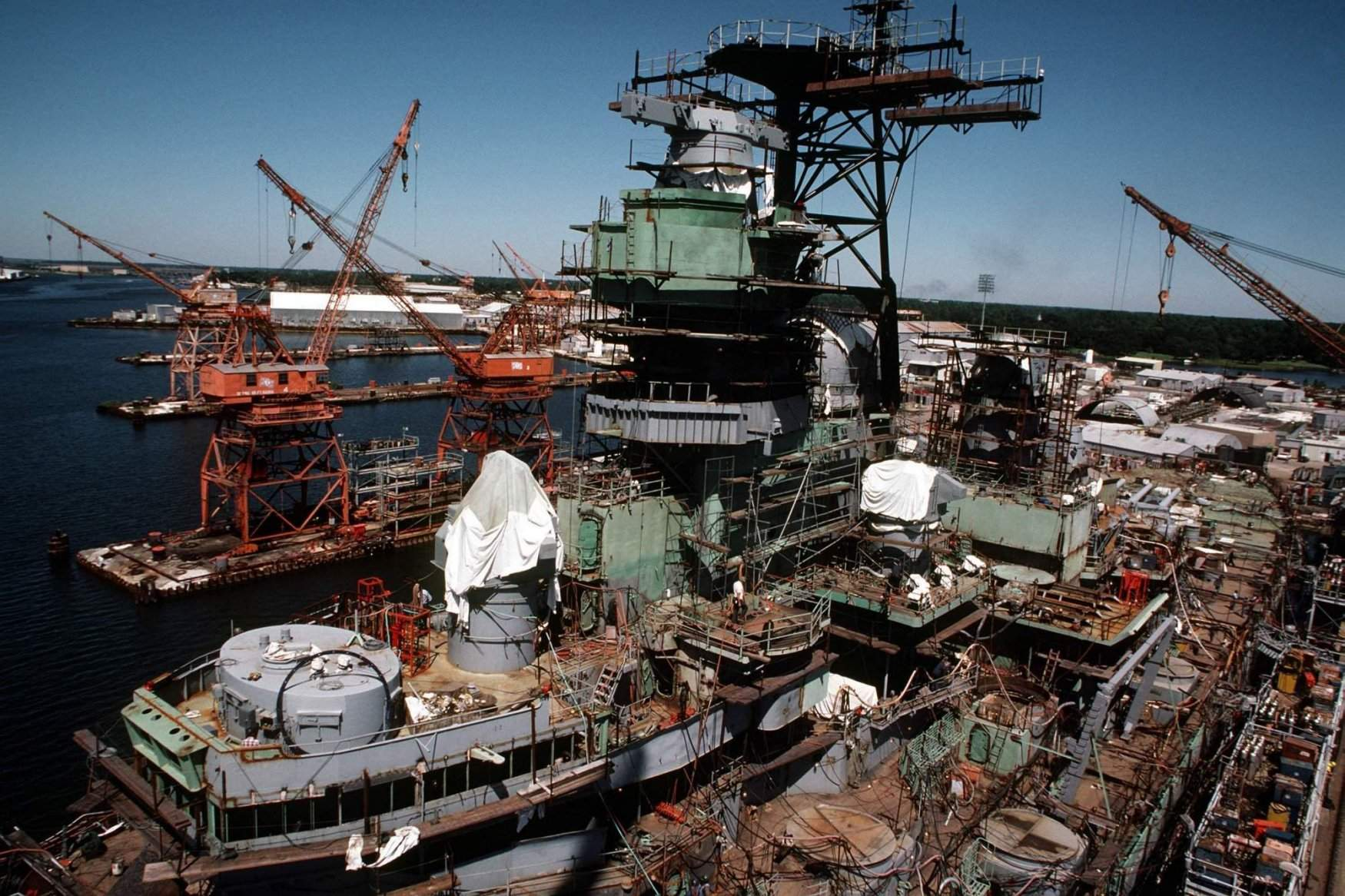
USS Iowa in drydock undergoing modernization

As part of President Ronald Reagan and Secretary of the Navy John F. Lehman's efforts to create an expanded 600-ship Navy, Iowa was reactivated in 1982 and towed by USNS Apache to Avondale Shipyard near New Orleans, Louisiana, for refitting and equipment modernization in advance of her planned recommissioning. During the refit, Iowa had all of her remaining Oerlikon 20 mm and Bofors 40 mm antiaircraft guns removed, due to their ineffectiveness against modern fighter jets and antiship missiles. Additionally, the two 5 in (127 mm) gun mounts located at midship and in the aft on the port and starboard sides of the battleship were removed.

Iowa was then towed to Ingalls Shipbuilding in Pascagoula, Mississippi, where over the next several months, the battleship was upgraded with the most advanced weaponry available. Among the new weapons systems installed were four MK 141 quad-cell launchers for 16 AGM-84 Harpoon antiship missiles, eight armored box launcher mounts for 32 BGM-109 Tomahawk missiles, and a quartet of Phalanx close-in weapon systems for defense against enemy antiship missiles and enemy aircraft. Sometime after June 1986, Iowa was the first battleship to receive the RQ-2 Pioneer unmanned aerial vehicle. She could carry up to eight of the remotely controlled drones, which replaced the helicopters (although helicopters were not carried by battleships) previously used to spot for her nine 16 inch (406 mm)/50 cal Mark 7 guns. Also included in her modernization were upgrades to radar and fire-control systems for her guns and missiles, and improved electronic warfare capabilities. Armed as such, Iowa was formally recommissioned on 28 April 1984, ahead of schedule, within her budget at a cost of $500 million, and under the command of Captain Gerald E. Gneckow. To expedite the schedule, many necessary repairs to Iowa's engines and guns were not completed and the mandatory Navy Board of Inspection and Survey (InSurv) inspection was skipped.

=== Shakedown and NATO exercises (1984–1989) ===
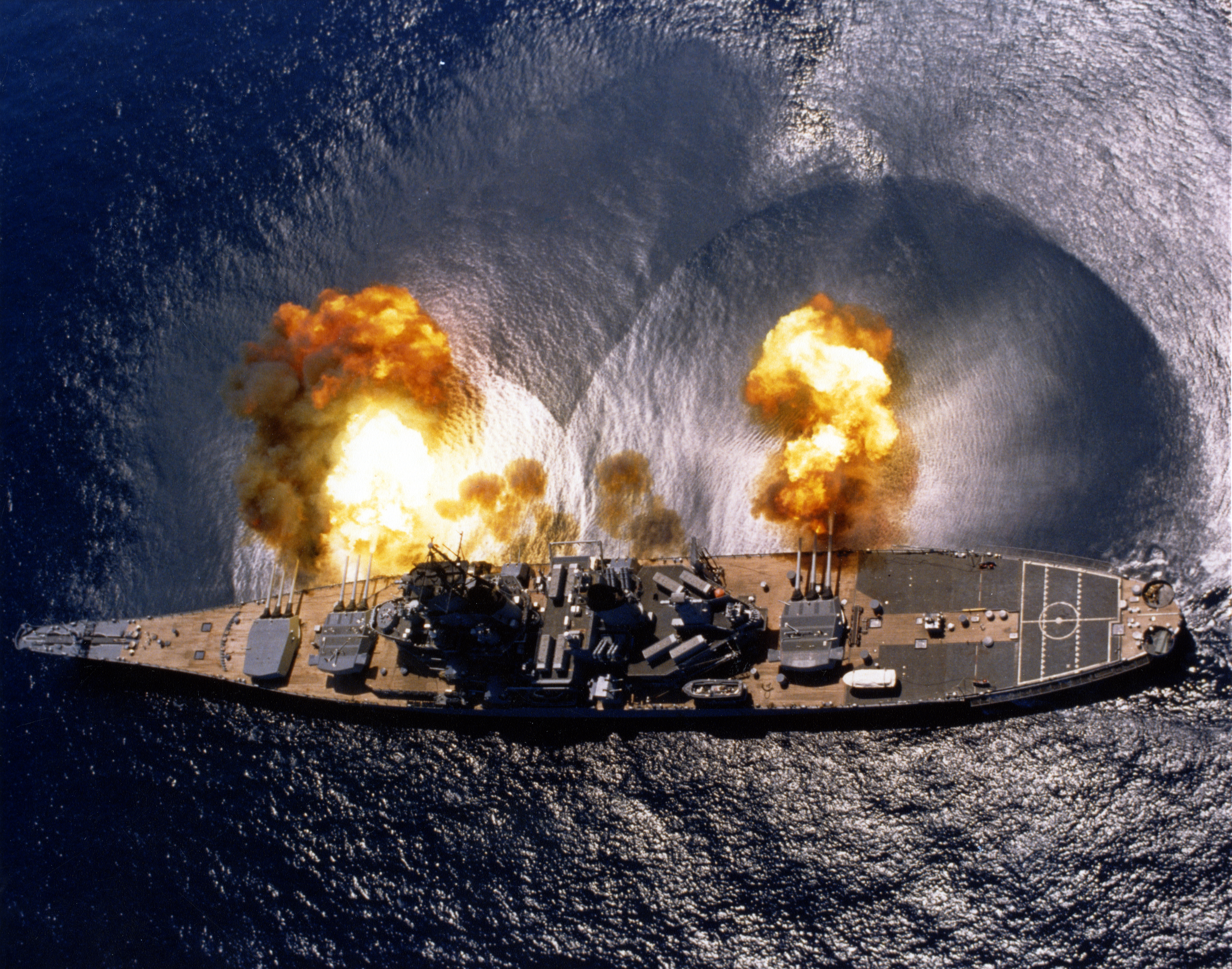
Iowa fires a full broadside of nine 16-inch (406 mm)/50-caliber and six 5-inch (127 mm)/38 cal guns

From April to August 1984, Iowa underwent refresher training and naval gunfire support qualifications at Guantanamo Bay, Cuba, and the Puerto Rican operating area. After a short period in her new home port of Norfolk, Virginia, she spent the two times during the rest of 1984 and early 1985 conducting "presence" operations shakedown in the area around Central America. During this time she transited the Panama Canal to operate off the west coast of Central America while also conducting people-to-people humanitarian operations, including in El Salvador, Costa Rica and Honduras, before returning to the United States in April 1985 for a period of routine maintenance.

In August 1985, Iowa joined 160 other ships for Exercise Ocean Safari, a NATO naval exercise aimed at testing NATO's ability to control sea lanes and maintain free passage of shipping. Owing to bad weather, Iowa and the other ships were forced to ride out rough seas, but she made use of the time to practice hiding herself from enemy forces. While serving with the exercise force, Iowa crossed the Arctic Circle. In October, she took part in Baltic operations, and fired her phalanx guns, 5 in (127 mm) guns, and 16 in (406 mm) guns in the Baltic Sea on 17 October while operating with US and other allied ships. After these operations during which she visited Le Havre in France, Kiel in Germany, Copenhagen (where the current King of Denmark visited the ship as a schoolboy) and Aarhus in Denmark, and Oslo in Norway, where the King of Norway was entertained at lunch, she returned to the United States.

Beginning on 17 March 1986, Iowa underwent her overdue InSurv inspection, conducted under the supervision of Rear Admiral John D. Bulkeley, which she ultimately failed. Bulkeley found that the ship was unable to achieve her top speed of 33 kn (38 mph; 61 km/h) during a full-power engine run. Other problems included hydraulic fluid leaks in all three main gun turrets, electrical wiring shorts, pump failures, deteriorated bilge piping, unrepaired soft patches on high-pressure steam lines, and frozen valves in the ship's firefighting system. He recommended to the chief of Naval Operations and Lehman that Iowa be taken out of service immediately. Rejecting this advice, Lehman instead instructed the leaders of the Atlantic Fleet to ensure that Iowa's deficiencies were corrected.

Afterward, Iowa returned to the waters around Central America and conducted drills and exercises, while she provided military presence to friendly nations. On 4 July, President Ronald Reagan and First Lady Nancy Reagan boarded Iowa for the International Naval Review, which was held in the Hudson River. On 25 April, Captain Larry Ray Seaquist assumed command of the battleship and her crew during Naval Gunfire Support requalification off Vieques Island near Puerto Rico.

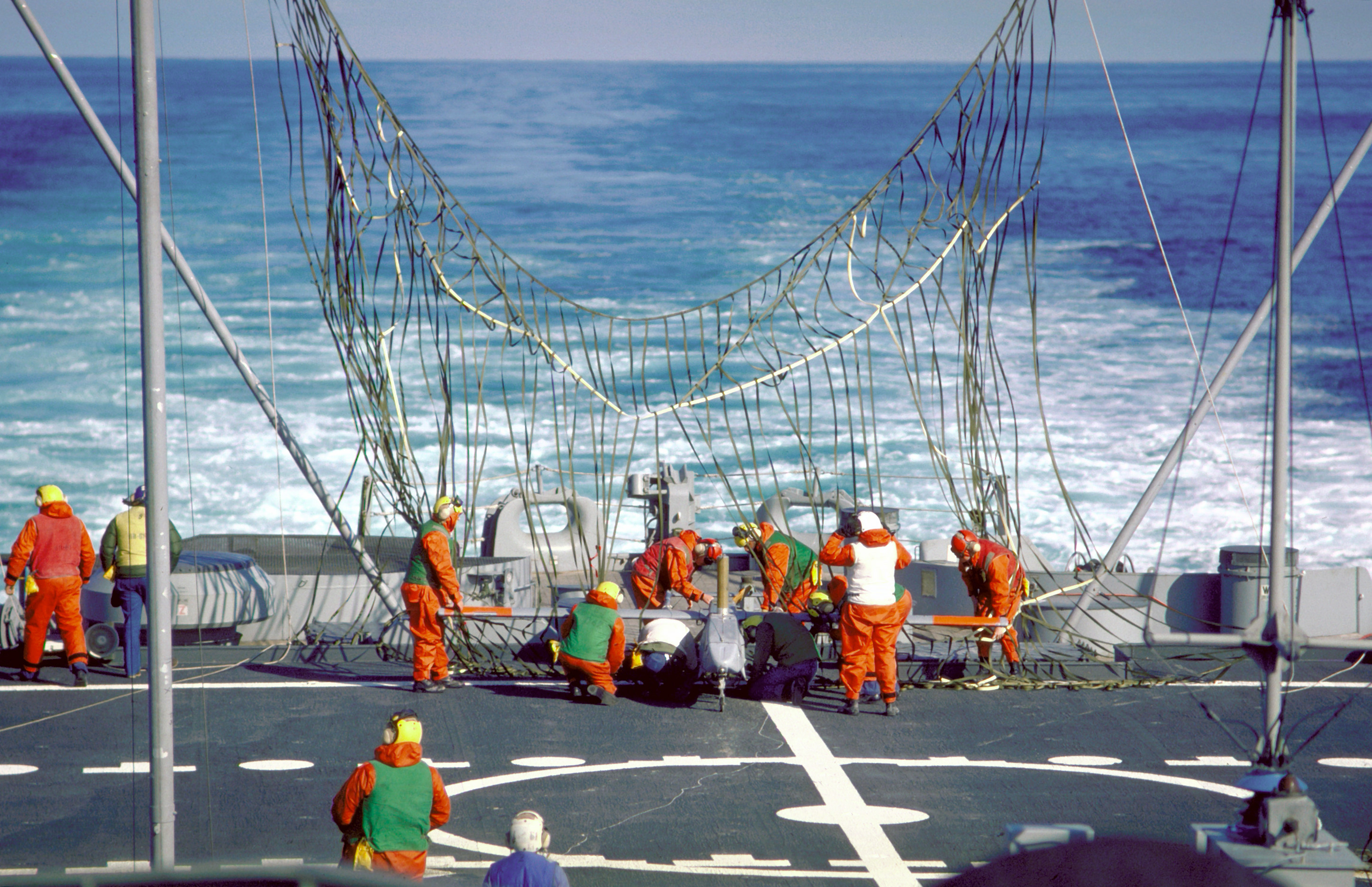
Crewmen recover an RQ-2 Pioneer UAV aboard Iowa

On 17 August, Iowa set sail for the North Atlantic. In September, she participated in Exercise Northern Wedding by ferrying Marines ashore and assisting helicopter gunships. During the exercise, Iowa fired her main guns at Cape Wrath range in Scotland in support of a simulated amphibious assault on 5–6 September, firing a total of 19 16-inch (406 mm) shells and 32 5-inch (127 mm) shells during a 10-hour period and operating in rough seas. During the live-fire exercise, a small number of Iowa Marines were put ashore to monitor the fall of shot and advise the battleship of gunnery corrections. Afterward, Iowa visited ports, including Portsmouth in England, and Germany, before returning to the United States in October.

In December, the ship became the testbed for the Navy's RQ-2 Pioneer (UAV). The drone was designed to serve as an aerial spotter for the battleship's guns, thereby allowing the guns to be used against an enemy without the need for an airplane or helicopter spotter. Pioneer passed its tests and made its first deployment that same month aboard Iowa.

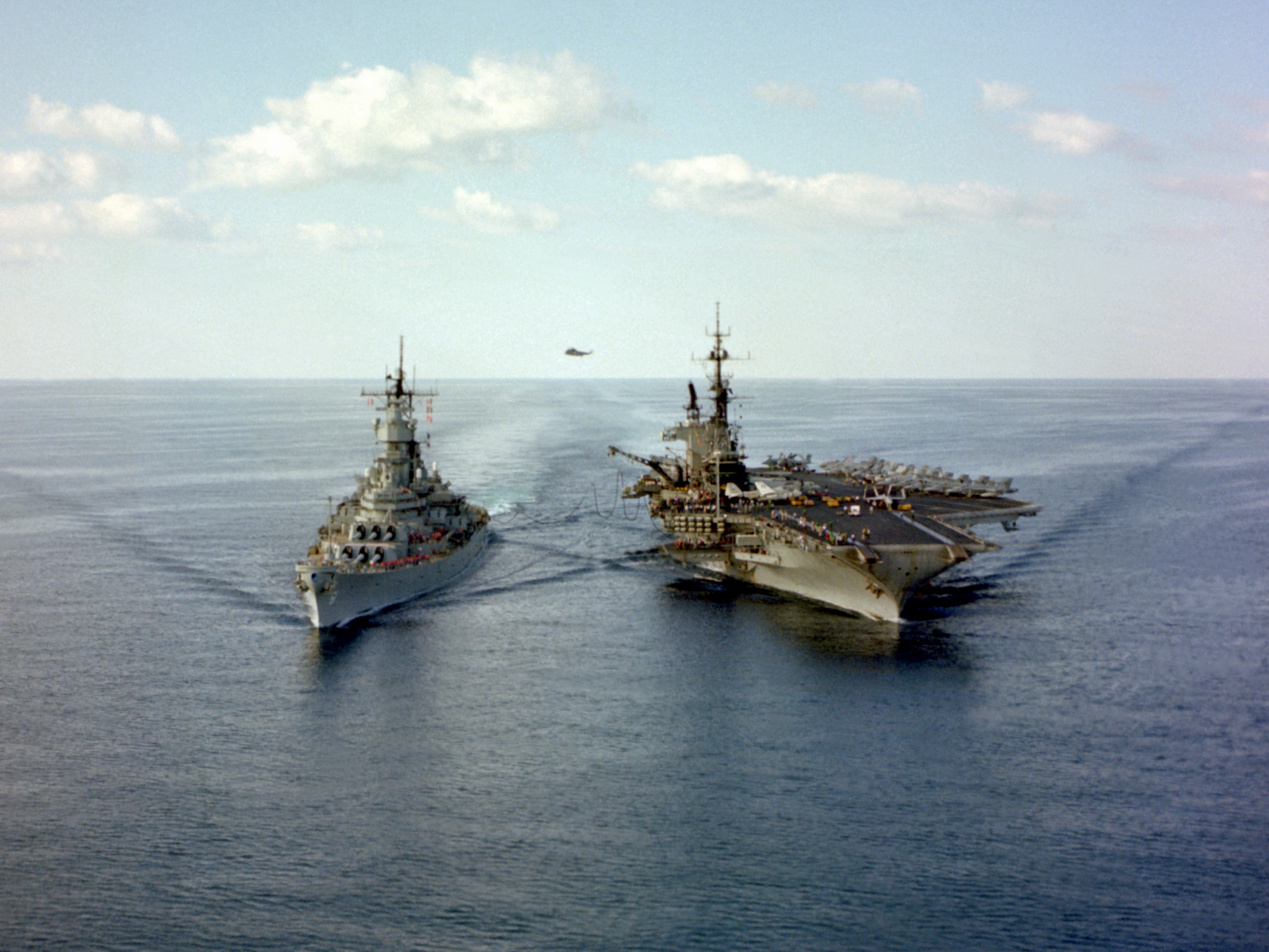
Iowa conducting an underway replenishment with USS Midway in the Persian Gulf in December 1987

From January–September 1987, Iowa operated in the waters in and around Central America and participated in several exercises until sailing for the Mediterranean Sea on 10 September to join the 6th Fleet based there. She remained in the Mediterranean until 22 October, when she was detached from the 6th Fleet and departed for operations in the North Sea. On 25 November, as part of Operation Earnest Will, Iowa transited the Suez Canal and set sail for the Persian Gulf, which at the time was one of the battlefields of the first Gulf War (also referred to as the Iran–Iraq War). The presence of US naval vessels in the gulf was in response to a formal petition from Kuwait, whose ships were being raided by Iranian forces who were attempting to cut off weapons shipments from the United States and Europe to Saddam Hussein's regime in Iraq, via Kuwaiti territory. This phase of the war was later called the "Tanker War" phase of the Iran–Iraq War. Iowa and other vessels operating in the gulf were assigned to escort Kuwaiti tankers from Kuwaiti ports to the open sea, but because US law forbade military escorts for civilian ships flying a foreign flag, the tankers escorted by the United States were reflagged as US merchant vessels and assigned American names. For the remainder of the year, Iowa escorted Kuwaiti gas and oil tankers reflagged as US merchant ships from the Persian Gulf through the Strait of Hormuz.

On 20 February 1988, Iowa departed from the Persian Gulf, transited the Suez Canal, and set sail for the United States, arriving at Norfolk on 10 March for routine maintenance. In April, she participated in the annual Fleet Week celebrations before returning to Norfolk for an overhaul. On 26 May, Fred Moosally replaced Larry Seaquist as captain of Iowa. After the overhaul, Moosally took Iowa on a shakedown cruise around Chesapeake Bay on 25 August. Encountering difficulty in conning the ship through shallow water, Moosally narrowly missed colliding with the frigate Moinester, destroyer Farragut, and cruiser South Carolina before running aground in soft mud outside the bay's main ship channel near the Thimble Shoals. After one hour, Iowa was able to extricate herself without damage and return to port. Iowa continued with sea trials throughout August and September, then began refresher training in the waters around Florida and Puerto Rico in October, during which the ship passed an Operation Propulsion Program evaluation.

On 20 January 1989, during an improperly authorized gunnery experiment off Vieques Island, Iowa fired a 16-inch (406 mm) shell 23.4 nmi (26.9 mi; 43.3 km), setting a record for the longest-ranged 16 in (406 mm) shell ever fired. In February, the battleship sailed for New Orleans for a port visit before departing for Norfolk. On 10 April, the battleship was visited by the commander of the 2nd Fleet, and on 13 April, she sailed to participate in a fleet exercise.

=== 1989 turret explosion ===
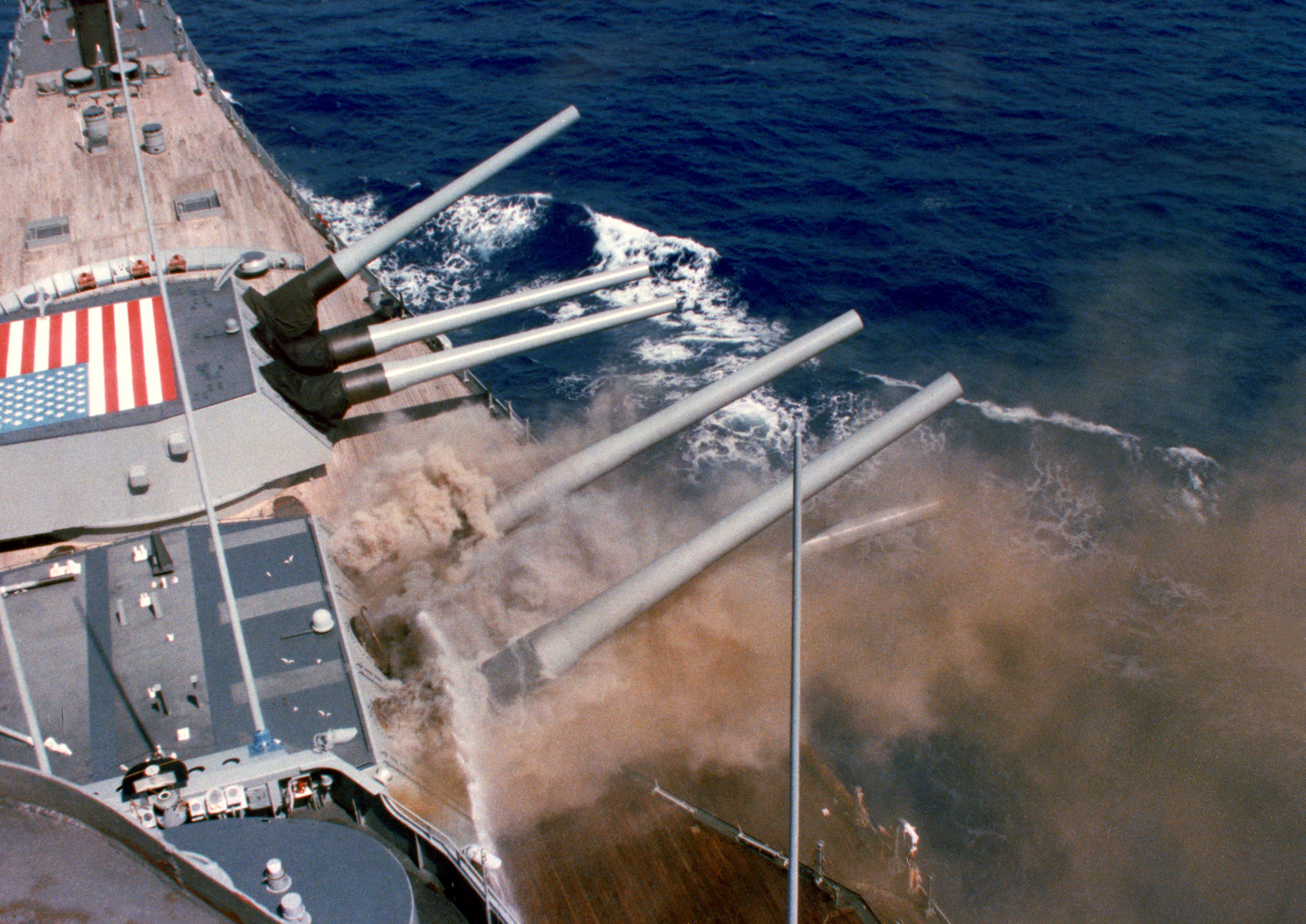
Heavy smoke pours from Turret Two following an internal explosion on 19 April 1989

During a gunnery exercise, at 0955 on 19 April 1989, an explosion ripped through the Number Two 16-inch (406 mm) gun turret, killing 47 crewmen. A gunner's mate in the powder magazine room quickly flooded the No. 2 powder magazine, likely preventing catastrophic damage to the ship. At first, Naval Investigative Service (NIS, later renamed Naval Criminal Investigative Service or NCIS) investigators theorized that one of the dead crewmen, Clayton Hartwig, had detonated an explosive device in a suicide attempt after the end of an alleged affair with another sailor. To support this claim, naval officials pointed to several different factors, including Hartwig's life insurance policy, which named Kendall Truitt as the sole beneficiary in the event of his death, the presence of unexplained materials inside turret 2, and his mental state, which was alleged to be unstable.

Although the Navy was satisfied with the investigation and its results, others were unconvinced, and in October 1991, amid increasing criticism, Congress forced the Navy to reopen the investigation. This second investigation, handled by independent investigators, was hampered as most of the original debris from Iowa had been cleaned up or otherwise disposed of by the Navy before and after the first investigation, but it did uncover evidence pointing to an accidental powder explosion due to over-ramming rather than an intentional act of sabotage.

While Iowa was undergoing modernization in the early 1980s, her sister ship New Jersey had been dispatched to Lebanon to provide offshore fire support. At the time, New Jersey was the only commissioned battleship anywhere in the world, and in an effort to get another battleship commissioned to relieve New Jersey, the modernization of Iowa was stepped up, leaving her in poor condition when she recommissioned in 1984. Captain Fred Moosally was found to be more concerned with the maintenance of the missiles than the training and manning of guns.

Powder from the same lot as the one under investigation was tested at the Naval Surface Warfare Center Dahlgren Division. Spontaneous combustion was achieved with the powder, which had been originally milled in the 1930s and improperly stored in a barge at the Navy's Yorktown, Virginia, Naval Weapons Station during a 1988 dry-docking of Iowa. As it degrades, gunpowder gives off ether gas, which is highly flammable and could be ignited by a spark, which could be caused by static electricity. This revelation resulted in a shift in the Navy's position on the incident, and Admiral Frank Kelso, the chief of Naval Operations at the time, publicly apologized to the Hartwig family in 1999, concluding that no real evidence supported the claim that he had intentionally killed the other sailors. Iowa captain Fred Moosally was severely criticized for his handling of the matter, and as a result of the incident, the Navy changed the powder-handling procedures for its battleships. The incident remains one of the surface Navy's worst losses of life during peacetime operations.

== Reserve Fleet and museum ship (1990–present) ==
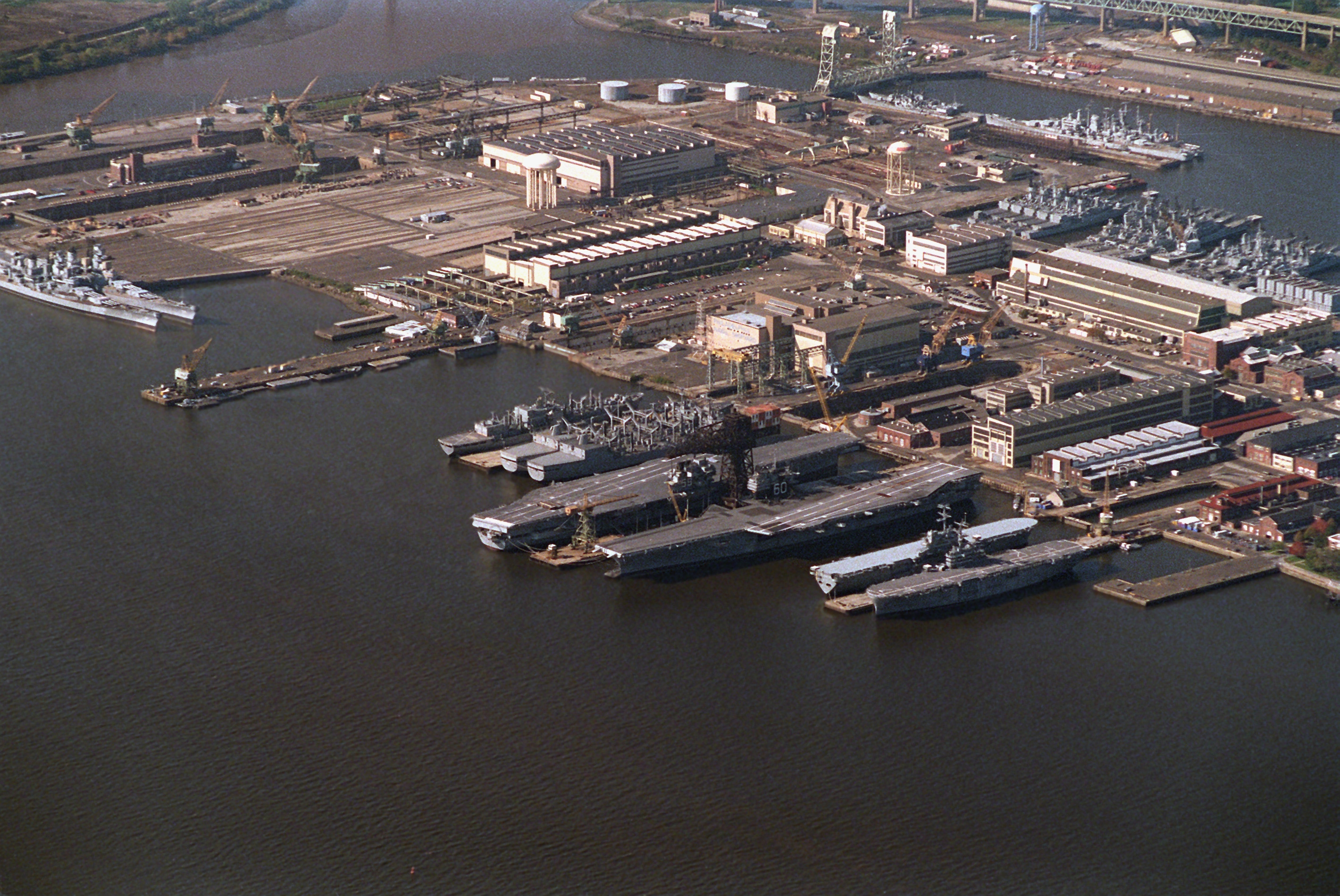
The Naval Inactive Ship Maintenance Facility at Philadelphia Navy Yard in 1995; Iowa is the battleship moored on the seaside of the wharf in the far left of the picture, next to Wisconsin.

With the collapse of the Soviet Union in the early 1990s and the lack of a perceived threat against the United States came drastic cuts to the defense budget, and the battleships were deemed uneconomical. As a result, Iowa was decommissioned for the last time on 26 October 1990, after a total of 19 years of commissioned service. She was the first of the reactivated battleships to be decommissioned, and this was done earlier than originally planned as a result of the damaged turret. Iowa was originally berthed at the Philadelphia Naval Shipyard and later at Naval Station Newport in Newport, Rhode Island, from 24 September 1998 to 8 March 2001, when the tug Sea Victory began her tow to California. The ship arrived in Suisun Bay near San Francisco on 21 April 2001 and joined the Reserve Fleet, where she remained in reserve until struck again from the Naval Vessel Register in March 2006. (Her sister ships and she had been struck previously in 1995.) She remained at the Suisun Bay anchorage until November 2011.

Section 1011 of the National Defense Authorization Act of 1996 required the US Navy to reinstate to the Naval Vessel Register two of the Iowa-class battleships that had been struck by the Navy in 1995; these ships were to be maintained in the United States Navy reserve fleets (or "mothball fleet"). The Navy was to ensure that both of the reinstated battleships were in good condition and could be reactivated for use in the Marine Corps' amphibious operations. Due to Iowa's damaged turret, the Navy selected New Jersey for placement into the mothball fleet. The cost to fix New Jersey was considered less than the cost to fix Iowa; as a result, New Jersey and Wisconsin were reinstated to the Naval Vessel Register and placed back in the reserve fleet.

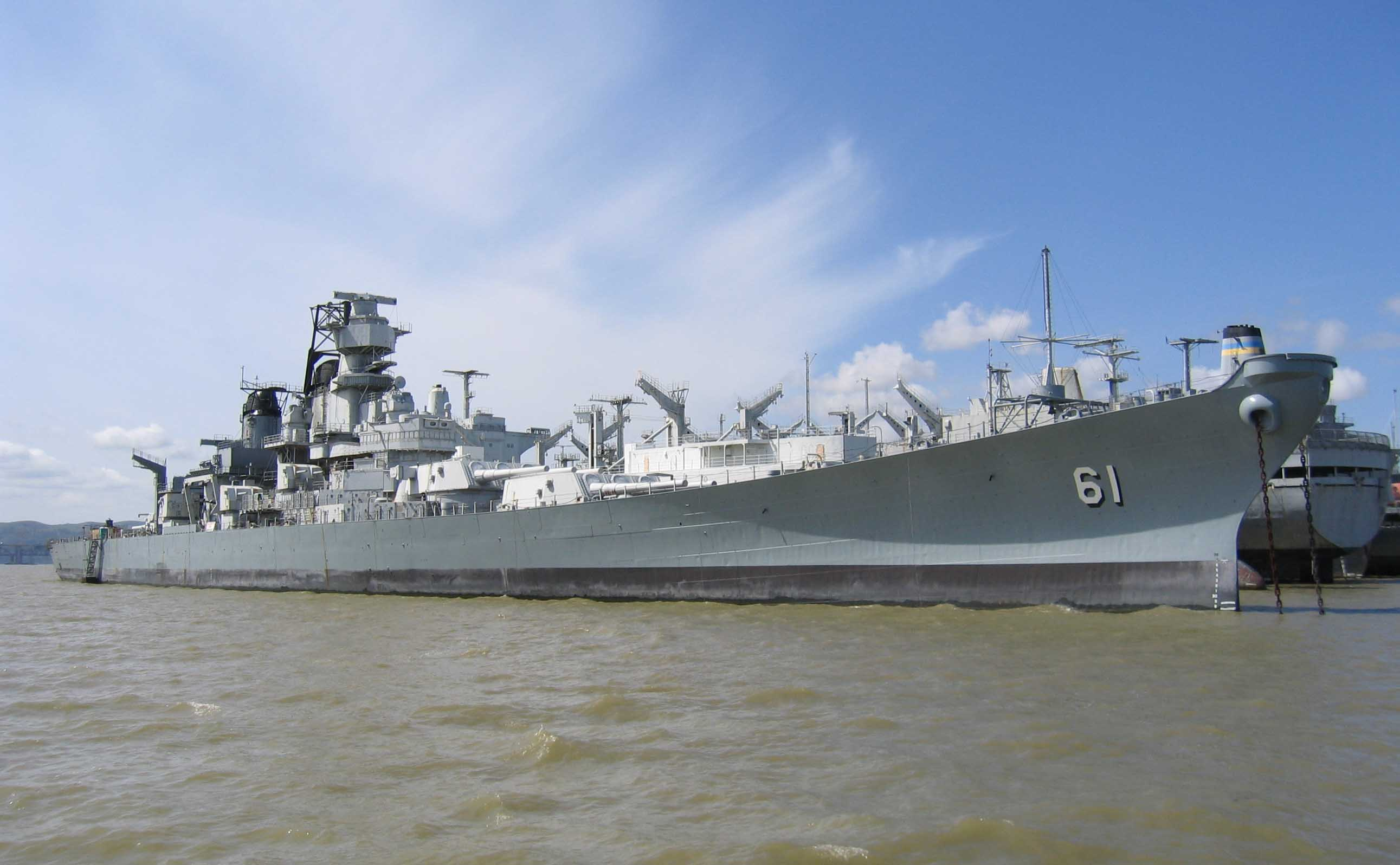
Iowa laid up in Suisun Bay in March 2006

New Jersey remained there until the Strom Thurmond National Defense Authorization Act of 1999 required the secretary of the Navy to list and maintain Iowa and Wisconsin on the Naval Vessel Register (NVR). The act also required the secretary of the Navy to strike New Jersey from the NVR and transfer the battleship to a not-for-profit entity in accordance with section 7306 of Title 10 of the United States Code. It also required the transferee to locate the battleship in the state of New Jersey. The Navy made the switch in January 1999, allowing New Jersey to open as a museum ship in her namesake state.

On 17 March 2006, the Secretary of the Navy struck Iowa and Wisconsin from the NVR, which cleared the way for both ships to be donated for use as museum ships, but the United States Congress remained "deeply concerned" over the loss of the naval surface gunfire support that the battleships provided, and noted that "navy efforts to improve upon, much less replace, this capability have been highly problematic." As a partial consequence, Congress passed Pub. L. 109–163 (text) (PDF), the National Defense Authorization Act 2006, requiring that the battleships be kept and maintained in a state of readiness should they ever be needed again. Congress ordered that measures be implemented to ensure that, if need be, Iowa could be returned to active duty. These measures closely mirrored the original three conditions that the National Defense Authorization Act of 1996, which laid out for the maintenance of Iowa while she was in the "mothball fleet".

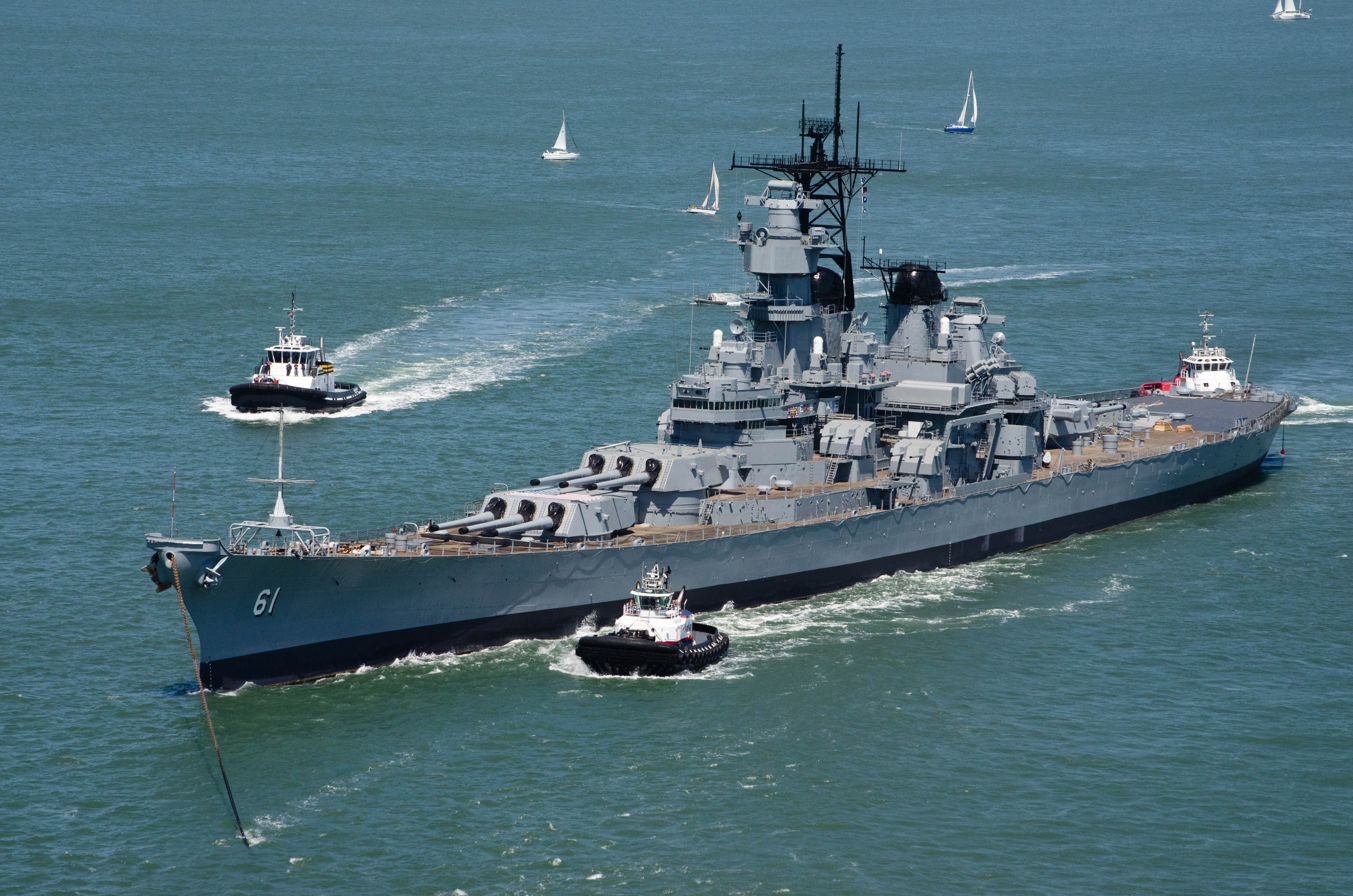
Iowa being towed to Los Angeles in May 2012

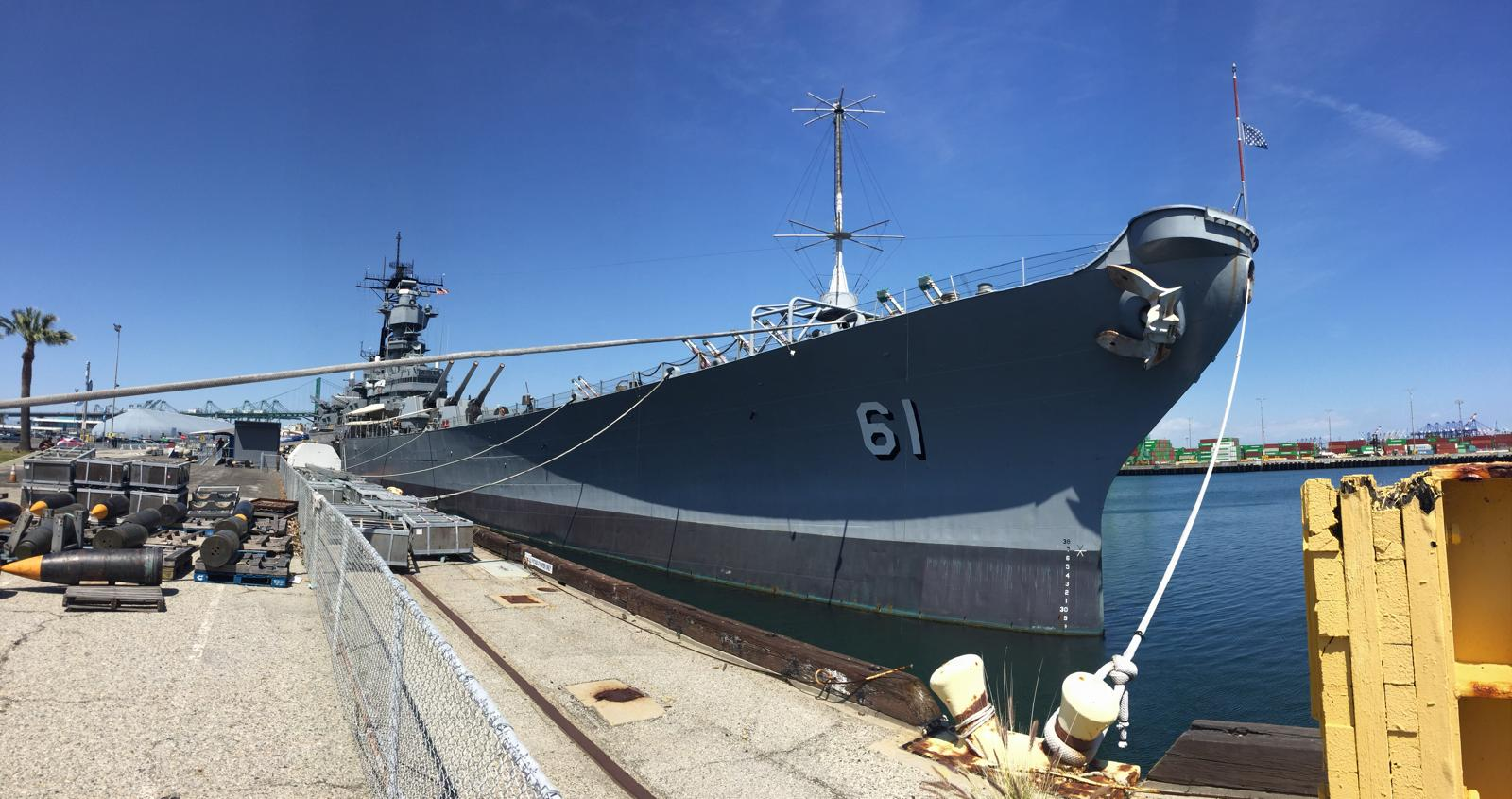
Iowa docked at Los Angeles harbor in May 2024

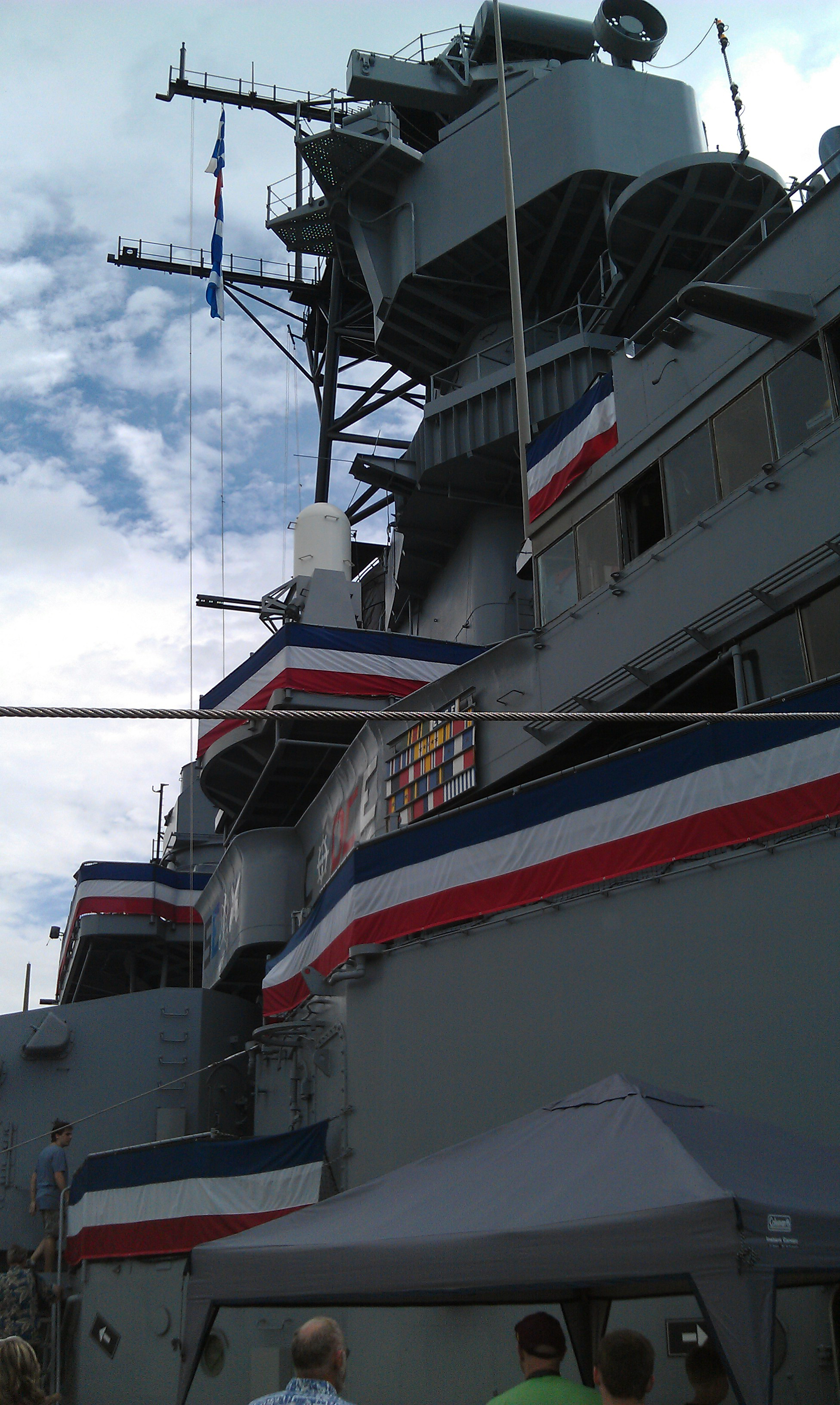
Iowa's superstructure is decked out in red, white, and blue banners following her official opening as a museum ship in Los Angeles. A display of her ribbons and awards earned during her career can be seen below and to the right of the Phalanx CIWS mount.

In March 2007, the Historic Ships Memorial at Pacific Square (HSMPS) of Vallejo, site of the former Mare Island Naval Shipyard, and a Stockton group submitted proposals to use the ship as a museum. The HSMPS, which had attempted to place the ship in San Francisco, supported the Mare Island–Vallejo site. In October 2007, the Navy informed HSMPS that they were the only viable candidate to acquire Iowa, and their application would be further reviewed after evidence was presented that financing was in place, and when the Stockton and San Francisco groups withdrew or failed to submit a final application, respectively. On 25 April 2009, Iowa Senate Resolution No. 19 was approved, endorsing HSMPS as USS Iowa's custodian and supporting the battleship's placement at Mare Island.

In February 2010, the Pacific Battleship Center (PBC) supported the efforts to have the ship berthed in San Pedro, Los Angeles, California. In late February the Port of Los Angeles (which includes the San Pedro area) rejected a proposal by the PBC to berth USS Iowa at its facilities because the battleship was not yet available. On 12 April 2010, the Governor of Iowa signed into law Bill SJR2007, which officially formed a 10-member committee to raise about $5 million for the group awarded USS Iowa. The statement supporting the Vallejo group in the original Iowa State Senate's version SR19 was struck in favor of supporting any group actually awarded the battleship.

On 13 May 2010, the Navy announced it would reopen the bidding process, citing HSMPS's lack of progress as the reason. On 24 May 2010 the Federal Register officially reopened the bidding process for USS Iowa to a California-based city or non-profit organization.

On 18 November 2010, the Port of Los Angeles Harbor Commissioners voted unanimously on a resolution to support Berth 87 as the future home of USS Iowa, clearing the way for the PBC to send its completed application to the Navy. On 6 September 2011, USS Iowa was awarded to Pacific Battleship Center for placement at the Port of Los Angeles. After rehabilitation at the Port of Richmond, California (beginning in October 2011), she was towed to and eventually berthed in the Port of Los Angeles.

Starting in December 2011, USS Iowa was open for weekend tours. The Battleship Expo at the Port of Richmond included shipboard access and other exhibits such as 16-inch shells, a short film about the battleship, and other exhibits. On 30 April 2012, USS Iowa was officially donated to the Pacific Battleship Center in Los Angeles by the United States Navy.

Iowa began her journey to the Port of Los Angeles on 26 May 2012 under tow by four Crowley Maritime tugboats. After being anchored off the Southern California coast to have her hull scrubbed to remove any invasive species or contaminants, on 9 June 2012, she was permanently docked in San Pedro at Berth 87, along the Main Channel, directly south of the World Cruise Center. The museum opened to the public on 7 July, under the direction and control of PBC.

== Awards ==
Iowa earned nine battle stars for World War II service and two for Korean War service. She has also earned these awards:

Navy Meritorious Unit Commendation with star		Navy E Ribbon with three Battle E devices
American Campaign Medal	Asiatic–Pacific Campaign Medal with nine battle stars	World War II Victory Medal
Navy Occupation Service Medal	National Defense Service Medal with star	Korean Service Medal with two battle stars
Armed Forces Expeditionary Medal	Navy Sea Service Deployment Ribbon	Philippine Presidential Unit Citation
South Korean Presidential Unit Citation	Philippine Liberation Medal	United Nations Korea Medal

== See also ==
- List of museum ships
