= Mariette Rheiner Garner =

Second Lady of the United States from 1933 to 1941

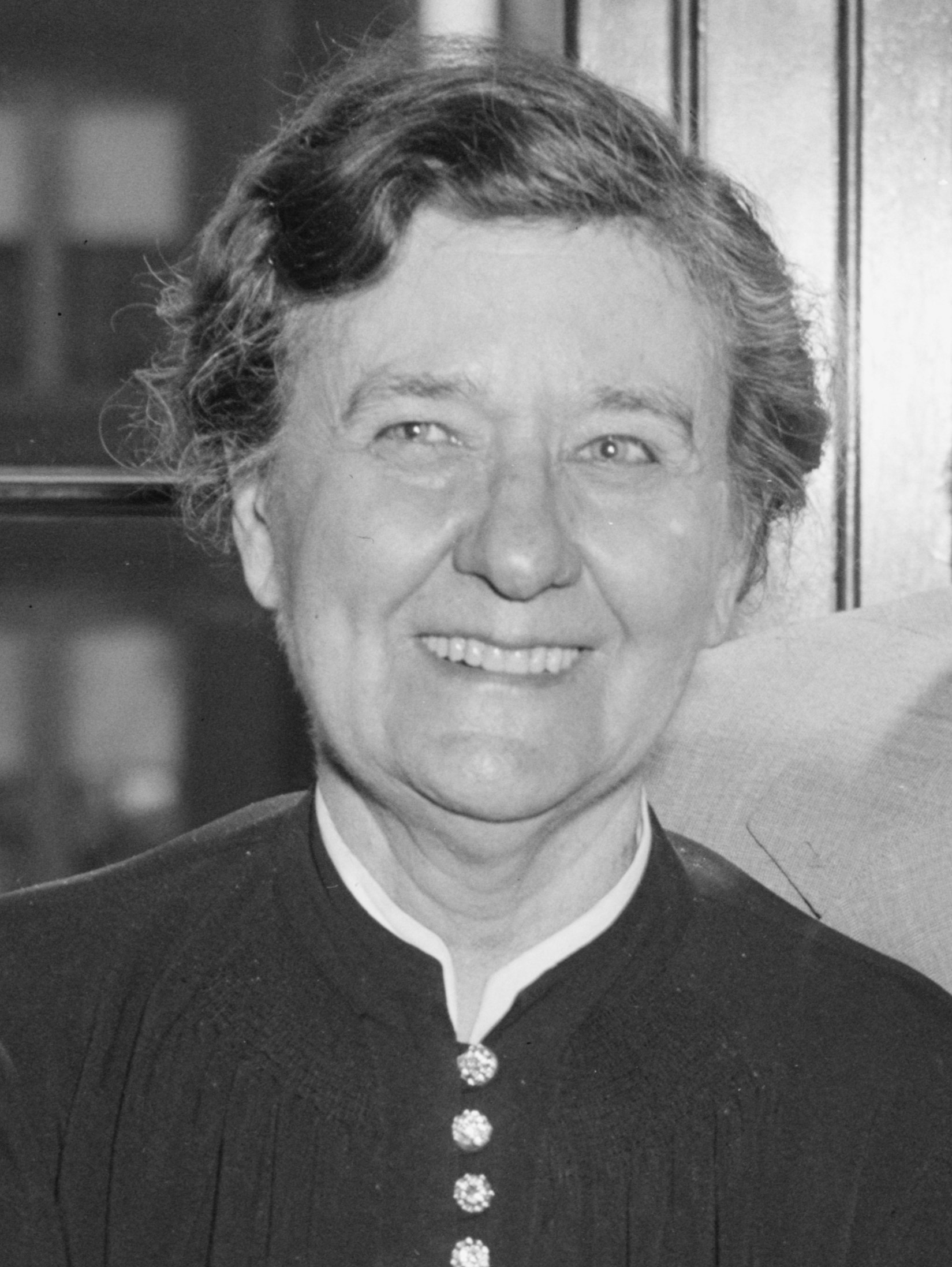
- Rheiner Garner in 1937

Second Lady of the United States
- In role March 4, 1933 – January 20, 1941
- Vice President: John Nance Garner
- Preceded by: Caro Dawes
- Succeeded by: Ilo Wallace

Personal details
- Born: Mariette Elizabeth Rheiner; July 17, 1869 Sabinal, Texas, U.S.
- Died: August 17, 1948 (aged 79) Uvalde, Texas, U.S.
- Party: Democratic
- Spouse: John Nance Garner (m. 1895)
- Children: 1

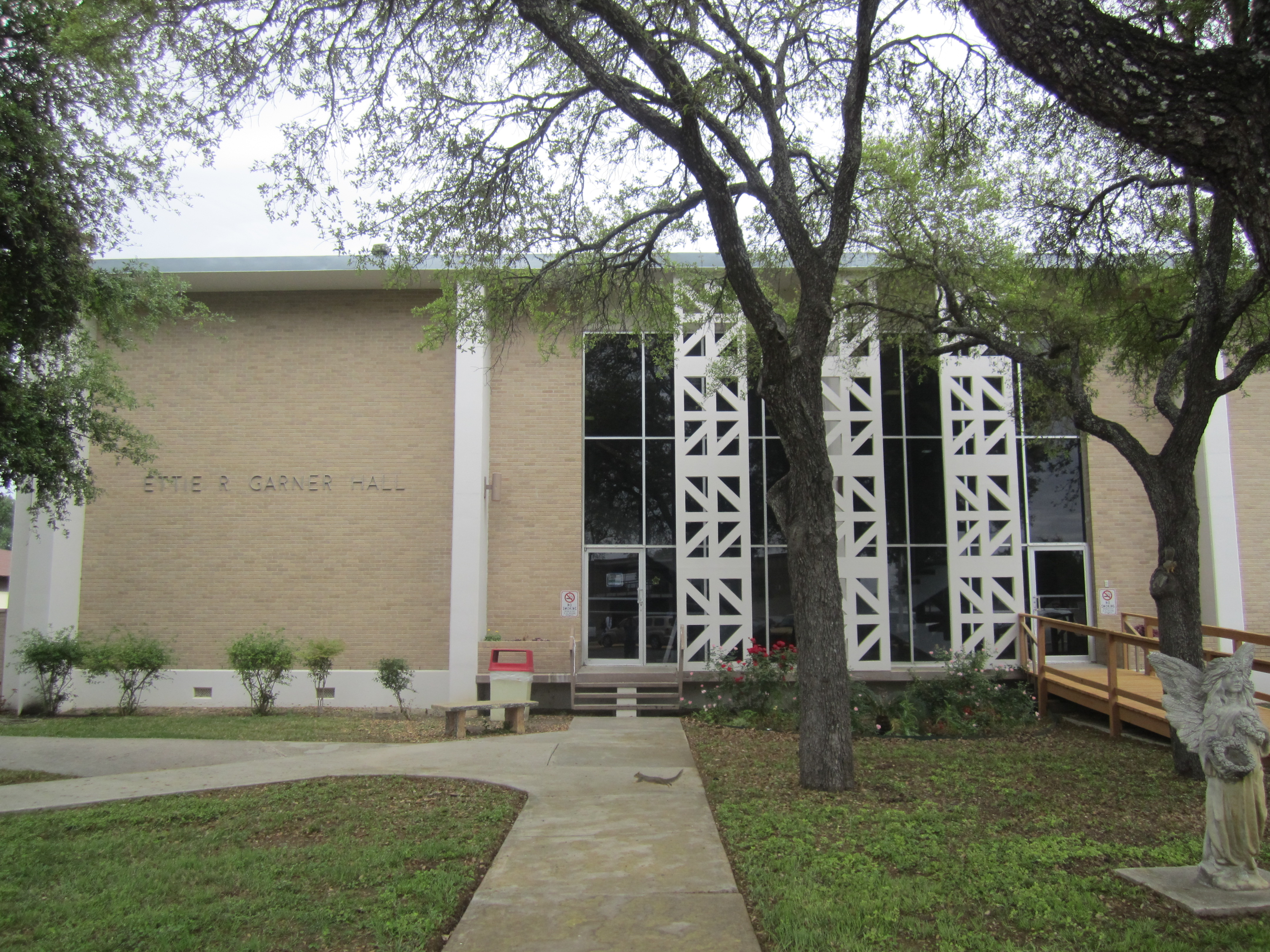
Ettie R. Garner Hall is the women's dormitory at Southwest Texas Junior College in Uvalde, named for the wife of the former Vice President of the United States John Nance Garner.

Mariette Elizabeth "Ettie" Rheiner Garner (née Rheiner; July 17, 1869 – August 17, 1948) was the wife of U.S. vice president John Nance Garner and thus second lady of the United States from 1933 to 1941.

== Biography ==
Mariette Elizabeth "Ettie" Rheiner Garner was born in Sabinal, Texas in 1869, to John Peter Rheiner, a Swiss immigrant who became a Texas rancher, and his first wife, the former Mary Elizabeth Watson.

In 1893, although women in Texas could not vote at the time, Mariette Rheiner ran for Uvalde County judge. She was defeated by the incumbent, John Nance Garner. Two years later, on November 25, 1895, she married Garner in Sabinal, Texas. They had one child, a son, Tully Charles Garner (1896–1968). In an interview in 1940, she denied running against Garner.

During her husband's tenure in the U.S. House of Representatives, from 1903 to 1933, Ettie Garner served as his private secretary, prior to her role as second lady of the United States.

She suffered from Parkinson's disease from 1942 to 1948, slipped into a two-day coma, and died in Uvalde, Texas on August 17, 1948, a month after her 79th birthday.

Honorary titles
| Vacant Title last held by Caro Dawes | Second Lady of the United States; 1933–1941 | Succeeded by Ilo Wallace |
