= First family of the United States =

Family of the president of the United States

The first family of the United States is the family of the president of the United States, who is both head of state and head of government of the United States. Members of the first family consist of the president, the first lady of the United States, and any of their children. However, other close relatives of the president and first spouse, such as parents, grandchildren, stepchildren, and in-laws, may be classified as members of the first family if they reside in the Executive Residence of the White House Complex.

The current first family is the family of the 45th and 47th president of the United States, Donald Trump since 2025.

In the United States, the term "first family" in casual reference to the president's immediate family, is most often used by the media and in particular, the White House press corps. Individually, each member of the first family is designated a Secret Service code name by the United States Secret Service. Used by special agents, these code names uniquely identify members of the first family for their ongoing protection as well as for the sake of brevity, clarity and tradition.

== List ==
No.	Portrait	First family	Years	President and First Spouse Children and family	Notes
1		Family of George Washington	April 30, 1789 — March 4, 1797	George and Martha Washington; Nelly and George	Since the Federal City was not completed when the President was inaugurated in 1789, the capital of the United States was first located in New York City between the years 1785 and 1790, later uprooting the federal government and moving it temporarily to the city of Philadelphia between the years 1790 and 1800. Because of this, the First Family never lived in the unfinished White House. Between April 1789 and February 1790, the First Family resided at the Alexander Macomb mansion at 39–41 Broadway Avenue in New York City. In Philadelphia, Robert Morris's mansion at 190 High Street was rented for the First Family to reside at. During his lifetime, the President never had children. However, he adopted the First Lady's two children, Jack and Patsy, from a previous marriage to Daniel Parke Custis. Likewise, the President also raised the First Lady's two youngest grandchildren, Nelly and George.
2		Family of John Adams	March 4, 1797 — March 4, 1801	John and Abigail Adams; Nabby, John Quincy, Charles and Thomas	The First Family during the Adams administration was the first to reside in the newly constructed White House (then known as the President's House) designed by Irish architect James Hoban. In 1797, the President appointed his oldest son, John Quincy, as Minister to Prussia. In 1800, the President and First Lady's second oldest son Charles died due to complications of alcoholism. Following in his father's footsteps, John Quincy would eventually be elected to the presidency in 1824 and take the oath of office the next year.
3		Family of Thomas Jefferson	March 4, 1801 — March 4, 1809	Thomas Jefferson and Martha Randolph (Daughter); Mary	There was no First Lady during the presidency as Jefferson's former wife, Martha Wayles Skelton Jefferson, died shortly after giving birth to their sixth child in 1782. In the conspicuous absence of First Lady, James Madison's wife, Dolley Madison, often served in the capacity as a White House hostess. Out of all six children of the Jeffersons, only Martha and Mary would survive into early adulthood.
4		Family of James Madison	March 4, 1809 — March 4, 1817	James and Dolley Madison and John	Prior to becoming First Lady and marrying the President, Dolley Madison was a widow who had two children, John Payne Todd and William Temple Todd, from a previous marriage to Quaker lawyer John Todd. Her husband and youngest son both suddenly died when yellow fever struck Philadelphia in 1793. The following year, she accepted Madison's proposal of marriage. Madison adopted her oldest son John. Perhaps Dolley Madison's most courageous act as First Lady was when she removed and saved several priceless valuables, objets d'art, china, silverware, and the famous Lansdowne Portrait of George Washington painted by Gilbert Stuart prior to British troops burning down the White House during the War of 1812.
5		Family of James Monroe	March 4, 1817 — March 4, 1825	James and Elizabeth Monroe; Eliza and Maria	During the President's term in office, his oldest daughter Eliza often substituted as official White House hostess for her ailing mother, the First Lady. Appearing as a haughty and often pompous socialite, Eliza soon alienated most of Washington society for her refusal to call on wives of the diplomatic corps, as was the custom. She caused another uproar when she closed her sister's wedding to all but family and friends. The second daughter, named Maria, was only a child when her father was elected president. When she finished school in Philadelphia, she moved into the Executive Residence in 1819. On March 9, 1820, she married her first cousin, Samuel L. Gouverneur, in the first wedding ever performed at the White House. The President and First Lady's only son, James, died much earlier in childhood.
6		Family of John Quincy Adams	March 4, 1825 — March 4, 1829	John Quincy and Louisa Adams; George, John, and Charles Francis	The President was the oldest son of the 2nd President of the United States, John Adams, and his wife, Abigail Adams. The President and First Lady's son, George, led a troubled life of alcoholism, womanizing, and depression and finally succumbed to an apparent suicide during the President's final year in office in 1829. Louisa Adams was the first foreign-born First Lady.
7		Family of Andrew Jackson	March 4, 1829 — March 4, 1837	Andrew Jackson; Andrew Jr., Daniel, Andrew, Andrew, Eliza, and Edward	Jackson's wife, Rachel, died shortly after he was elected president. Her niece Emily Donelson and the President's daughter-in-law Sarah Yorke Jackson served as his hostesses at the White House.
8		Family of Martin Van Buren	March 4, 1837 — March 4, 1841	Martin Van Buren and Angelica Singleton (Daughter-in-law); Abraham, John, Martin, and Smith	During the President's term, there was no First Lady. The President's wife died of tuberculosis much earlier in 1819. Their oldest son Abraham had a wife, Angelica Singleton Van Buren (a cousin of Dolley Madison), who assumed the duties of hostess at White House functions.
9		Family of William Henry Harrison	March 4, 1841 — April 4, 1841	William Henry and Anna Harrison; Elizabeth Bassett, John Scott, Mary Symmes, and Anna Tuthill	The President and First Lady had ten children, of whom only four were still alive at the time of Harrison's presidency. After taking the Oath of Office in March 1841, the President died just 31 days later of complications of a cold, making William Henry Harrison's term the shortest in United States presidential history to date. The President had a son, John Scott Harrison, who in turn became the father of future President Benjamin Harrison.
10		Family of John Tyler	April 4, 1841 — March 4, 1845	John and Letitia Tyler (d.1842), Julia Tyler (m.1844); Mary, Robert, John, Letitia, Elizabeth, Alice and Tazewell	During the President's term in office, there were two First Ladies. In 1839, Letitia suffered a paralytic stroke that left her an invalid. As First Lady, she remained in the upstairs living quarters of the White House, only coming downstairs just once, to attend the wedding of her daughter Elizabeth in January 1842. On the evening of September 10, 1842, the First Lady died peacefully. At the time of her death, she was 51 years old, making her the youngest First Lady to die. John and Letitia Tyler's children were the following: Mary Tyler-Jones, Robert Tyler (who served as the President's private secretary at the White House), John Tyler III, Letitia Tyler-Semple, Elizabeth Tyler-Waller (marrying William N. Waller at a White House wedding in 1842), Alice Tyler-Denison, and Tazewell Tyler. The second First Lady was Julia, who at age 24 married the President (aged 54) on June 26, 1844. John and Julia's children were the following: David Gardiner Tyler, John "Alex" Alexander Tyler, Julia Gardiner Tyler-Spencer, Lachlan Gardiner Tyler, Lyon Gardiner Tyler, Robert "Fitz" Fitzwalter Tyler, and Pearl Tyler-Ellis.
11		Family of James K. Polk	March 4, 1845 — March 4, 1849	James and Sarah Polk	The Polks remain the only presidential couple to never have children — biologically, adopted, or from previous marriage. However, after the president's death his widow fostered a niece, Sarah Polk Fall.
12		Family of Zachary Taylor	March 4, 1849 — July 9, 1850	Zachary and Margaret Taylor; Ann, Betty, and Richard	As a semi-invalid, the First Lady became a recluse and remained in seclusion on the second floor of the Executive Residence, leaving the duties of official hostess to her daughter Mary Elizabeth. They were the last family to own slaves in the White House, from 1849 to 1850.
13		Family of Millard Fillmore	July 9, 1850 — March 4, 1853	Millard and Abigail Fillmore; Millard, and Mary	During the presidential inauguration for her husband's successor Franklin Pierce in 1853, the First Lady caught a cold and the next day came down with a fever. Abigail Fillmore developed pneumonia and died weeks later, on March 30, 1853. Throughout much of the President's term in office and due to the First Lady's illness, their daughter Mary was hostess at many White House functions from 1850 to 1853.
14		Family of Franklin Pierce	March 4, 1853 — March 4, 1857	Franklin and Jane Pierce	Pierce's son Benjamin was killed in a train wreck two months before Pierce's inauguration. Jane Pierce arrived at the White House months later and spent most of their tenure in her room, writing letters to her dead son.
15		Family of James Buchanan	March 4, 1857 — March 4, 1861	James Buchanan	The President never married or had children. The President's niece, Harriet Lane, acted as First Lady and served as hostess at White House functions.
16		Family of Abraham Lincoln	March 4, 1861 — April 15, 1865	Abraham and Mary Todd Lincoln; Robert Todd, Willie, and Tad	In 1862, Willie, after riding his pony in bad weather, became ill. His condition fluctuated from day to day. The most likely cause of the illness was typhoid fever, contracted from contaminated drinking water. Gradually Willie weakened and on February 20, 1862, he died. The President and First Lady's second son, Edward, died earlier in 1850, most likely from a wasting disease called medullary thyroid cancer as part of the genetic cancer syndrome – multiple endocrine neoplasia, type 2B – that his father and two of his brothers may have shared. In 1871, their son Tad died at the age of 18 due to tuberculosis. Of the President and First Lady's four children, only Robert lived into adulthood; he died in 1926. Throughout the President's term in office, the First Lady suffered from severe headaches. Dealing with the death of her son Willie in 1862, as well as the deaths of siblings killed in the American Civil War, difficult bouts of mourning, especially after Willie's death, led to protracted depression. During her years at the White House, the First Lady suffered a severe head injury in a carriage accident, thought to be an assassination attempt targeting the President, who was not with her at the time. In addition to depression, the First Lady suffered from irrational, sometimes public outbursts.
17		Family of Andrew Johnson	April 15, 1865 — March 4, 1869	Andrew and Eliza Johnson; Martha, Mary, Robert, and Andrew Jr.	
18		Family of Ulysses S. Grant	March 4, 1869 — March 4, 1877	Ulysses and Julia Grant; Jesse, Ulysses Jr., Nellie, and Frederick	The Grant family was the last slave-holding family to live in the White House. Grant owned a slave during the Civil War but freed the slave soon after.
19		Family of Rutherford B. Hayes	March 4, 1877 — March 4, 1881	Rutherford and Lucy Hayes; Birchard, Webb, Rutherford, Fanny, and Scott	
20		Family of James Garfield	March 4, 1881 — September 19, 1881	James and Lucretia Garfield; Harry, James, Mary, Irvin, and Abram	
21		Family of Chester A. Arthur	September 19, 1881 — March 4, 1885	Chester A. Arthur; Chester II and Ellen	Chester Arthur's wife, Nell, died in January 1880; he succeeded to the presidency in September 1881.
22		Family of Grover Cleveland	March 4, 1885 — March 4, 1889	Grover and Frances Cleveland (m.1886)	Frances Cleveland was the youngest of the First Ladies. She and Cleveland married on June 2, 1886, when she was 21 years old. When she and Cleveland departed the White House, she told the staff 'take care of everything as we would like to see it just the way it is when we return, four years from today'.
23		Family of Benjamin Harrison	March 4, 1889 — March 4, 1893	Benjamin and Caroline Harrison; Russell and Mary	
24		Family of Grover Cleveland	March 4, 1893 — March 4, 1897	Grover and Frances Cleveland; Ruth, Esther and Marion	Esther Cleveland was born in 1893, she was the first and only child of a president to be born in the White House.
25		Family of William McKinley	March 4, 1897 — September 14, 1901	William and Ida McKinley	
26		Family of Theodore Roosevelt	September 14, 1901 — March 4, 1909	Theodore and Edith Roosevelt; Theodore Jr., Kermit, Ethel, Archie, and Quentin	In 1906, the President's oldest daughter, Alice Roosevelt Longworth, married Nicholas Longworth at the White House. Alice was another child from the President's previous marriage to his first wife, Alice Hathaway Lee Roosevelt, who died in 1884 due to childbirth complications and Bright's disease. The President's fifth cousin, Franklin D. Roosevelt, would become the 32nd President of the United States in 1933.
27		Family of William Howard Taft	March 4, 1909 — March 4, 1913	William Howard and Helen Taft; Robert, Helen, and Charles II	After the First Lady suffered a stroke in 1909, daughter Helen moved into the Executive Residence and helped her mother to regain body movement and speech. Helen also served as official hostess for many White House functions while the First Lady was disabled. The youngest son, Charles, was only 12 years old when he moved into the Executive Residence upon his father's inauguration as president.
28		Family of Woodrow Wilson	March 4, 1913 — March 4, 1921	Woodrow Wilson and Ellen Wilson (d.1914), Edith Wilson (m.1915); Margaret, Jessie, and Eleanor	On November 25, 1913, the second oldest daughter Jessie married Francis Bowes Sayre at the White House. On January 17, 1915, Jessie gave birth to a son, Francis B. Sayre, Jr., at the White House. On May 7, 1914, the youngest daughter Eleanor married her father's Secretary of the Treasury, William Gibbs McAdoo. There were two First Ladies during the Wilson administration. The President's first wife, Ellen, died at the White House on August 6, 1914, due to complications of Bright's disease. The following year, the President married his second wife, Edith. At the time of her mother's death in 1914, the oldest daughter Margaret served the role as First Lady until her father remarried in 1915.
29		Family of Warren G. Harding	March 4, 1921 — August 2, 1923	Warren and Florence Harding	The President never had children with his wife but had an illegitimate daughter, Elizabeth Ann Blaesing, with another woman, Nan Britton. In a previous marriage, the First Lady had a son named Marshall Eugene DeWolfe who died from complications of alcoholism and tuberculosis on January 1, 1915, at the age of 34.
30		Family of Calvin Coolidge	August 2, 1923 — March 4, 1929	Calvin and Grace Coolidge; John and Calvin Jr.	The President and First Lady's younger son, Calvin Jr., died during the President's 1924 election campaign. Their son John, who lived until 2000, married the daughter of Connecticut governor John H. Trumbull.
31		Family of Herbert Hoover	March 4, 1929 — March 4, 1933	Herbert and Lou Henry Hoover; Herbert, and Allan	
32		Family of Franklin D. Roosevelt	March 4, 1933 — April 12, 1945	Franklin and Eleanor Roosevelt; Anna, James, Elliott, Franklin Jr., and John	In 1937, the President's oldest son James moved into the Executive Residence and served as an advisor and private secretary in the West Wing. At the President's request, his daughter Anna moved into the Executive Residence in 1944 to serve as an assistant to the President and as White House hostess during the First Lady's frequent absences. A fifth son, Franklin Delano Roosevelt, Jr. (III), was born on March 18, 1909, and died approximately eight months later on November 7, 1909.
33		Family of Harry S. Truman	April 12, 1945 — January 20, 1953	Harry and Bess Truman and Margaret	Between the years 1948 and 1952, the First Family resided at Blair House, the official guest quarters of foreign heads of state and government located near Lafayette Park, while the White House underwent a complete interior restoration.
34		Family of Dwight D. Eisenhower	January 20, 1953 — January 20, 1961	Dwight and Mamie Eisenhower and John	President and Mrs. Eisenhower posed for this portrait on their 39th wedding anniversary at their farm in Gettysburg, Pennsylvania. The President and First Lady's eldest son, Doud, died of scarlet fever in 1921. Their only surviving son, John Eisenhower, served in various roles as an Assistant Staff Secretary in the West Wing, on the Army's General Staff, and in the White House as assistant to General Andrew Goodpaster.
35		Family of John F. Kennedy	January 20, 1961 — November 22, 1963	John and Jacqueline Kennedy; Caroline, John Jr., and Patrick	The President and First Lady's first-born daughter, Arabella, was stillborn in 1956. The First Lady gave birth prematurely to a second son, Patrick Bouvier Kennedy, on August 7, 1963. The child died two days later due to hyaline membrane disease. In 1999, John Jr. died in a plane crash, leaving his sister Caroline as the only surviving child of the President and First Lady.
36		Family of Lyndon B. Johnson	November 22, 1963 — January 20, 1969	Lyndon and Lady Bird Johnson; Lynda Bird, and Luci	The President and First Lady's oldest daughter Lynda married Charles S. Robb, a former Governor of Virginia and two-term U.S. Senator from Virginia, in the East Room at the White House on December 9, 1967.
37		Family of Richard Nixon	January 20, 1969 — August 9, 1974	Richard and Pat Nixon; Tricia and Julie	The Nixons' daughter Tricia married Edward Cox in the Rose Garden of the White House on June 12, 1971. The President and First Lady's other daughter, Julie Nixon Eisenhower, married David Eisenhower, a grandson of Dwight D. Eisenhower.
38		Family of Gerald Ford	August 9, 1974 — January 20, 1977	Gerald and Betty Ford; Susan, Michael, Jack and Steven	The President and First Lady's daughter Susan was a teenage high school student during her time in the White House. Their three sons Michael, Jack and Steven were all grown adults when the First Family moved into the Executive Residence in 1974.
39		Family of Jimmy Carter	January 20, 1977 — January 20, 1981	Jimmy and Rosalynn Carter; John, James Earl Carter III, Donnel, and Amy	The President and First Lady's three sons, John, James, and Donnel, were all grown adults when the First Family moved into the Executive Residence in 1977. Their daughter Amy was the first true child to live in the White House since the Kennedy children lived there between 1961 and 1963.
40		Family of Ronald Reagan	January 20, 1981 — January 20, 1989	Ronald and Nancy Reagan; Maureen, Michael, Patti, and Ron	Maureen and Michael were two of the President's children from his first marriage to Hollywood actress Jane Wyman while Patti and Ron were the President's two youngest children from his second marriage to Nancy Reagan.
41		Family of George H. W. Bush	January 20, 1989 — January 20, 1993	George and Barbara Bush; George W., Jeb, Neil, Marvin, and Dorothy	The President and First Lady's eldest daughter, Robin, died of leukemia in 1953. Arguably, other members of the First Family included First Mother/Grandmother Dorothy Wear Walker Bush (died in 1992), First Grandsons George, Jebby, Pierce, and Samuel LeBlond, and First Granddaughters Barbara, Jenna, Noelle, Lauren, Ashley and Ellie LeBlond.
42		Family of Bill Clinton	January 20, 1993 — January 20, 2001	Bill and Hillary Clinton and Chelsea	The President and First Lady's daughter Chelsea was born a First Daughter of Arkansas. Until she left the White House in 2001, the two-year period between her father's first and second terms as the Governor of Arkansas would be the only time when she did not have an unofficial title. Beginning on January 3, 2001, Hillary Rodham Clinton was both a U.S. senator for the state of New York while simultaneously carrying out her formal duties as First Lady, a title which she lost 17 days later on January 20, 2001, when President Clinton's term in office expired. Hillary was also the first woman to be nominated by a major U.S. political party in the presidential election.
43		Family of George W. Bush	January 20, 2001 — January 20, 2009	George W. and Laura Bush; Barbara and Jenna	Barbara and Jenna, fraternal twins, were also the nation's First Granddaughters, from January 20, 1989, to January 20, 1993. Barbara and Jenna were seven years old at the time of George H. W. Bush, their grandfather's, inauguration and eleven years old when he left office. The twins were both First Daughters of Texas from 1995, when they were thirteen, to 2001, when they were nineteen. Barbara and Jenna did not live in the White house, as both attended college while their father was the President. Jenna married Henry Chase Hager at the Prairie Chapel Ranch in Crawford, Texas on May 10, 2008.
44		Family of Barack Obama	January 20, 2009 — January 20, 2017	Barack and Michelle Obama; Malia and Sasha	Marian Shields Robinson, mother to the First Lady and mother-in-law to the President, lived with the First Family in the Executive Residence at the White House Complex. They were the first African American family to live in the White House.
45		Family of Donald Trump	January 20, 2017 — January 20, 2021	Donald and Melania Trump; Donald Jr., Ivanka, Eric, Tiffany, and Barron	Donald Jr., Ivanka and Eric are the President's children from his first marriage to Ivana Trump, while Tiffany is his daughter from his second marriage to Marla Maples and Barron is his son from his third marriage to Melania Trump. Barron is the first Presidential son to live at the White House since John F. Kennedy Jr. in 1963; however from January to June 2017, he remained with his mother at Trump Tower so he could complete his school year at Manhattan's Columbia Grammar & Preparatory School. Melania Trump is the second First Lady to be foreign-born after Louisa Adams and the first to be a naturalized citizen.
46		Family of Joe Biden	January 20, 2021 — January 20, 2025	Joe and Jill Biden; Hunter and Ashley	Hunter is the President's child from his marriage to Neilia Hunter, while Ashley is his daughter from his second marriage to Jill Biden. The President had two other children: Beau died of brain cancer in 2015, and Naomi was killed in the same car accident as Biden's first wife Neilia in 1972.
47		Family of Donald Trump	January 20, 2025 — present	Donald and Melania Trump; Donald Jr., Ivanka, Eric, Tiffany, and Barron	

== See also ==
- Adams family
- Bush family
- Harrison family
- Roosevelt family
- United States presidential pets
- Society of Presidential Descendants
