= James Wilson (journalist) =

Irish-American journalist and politician (1787–1850)

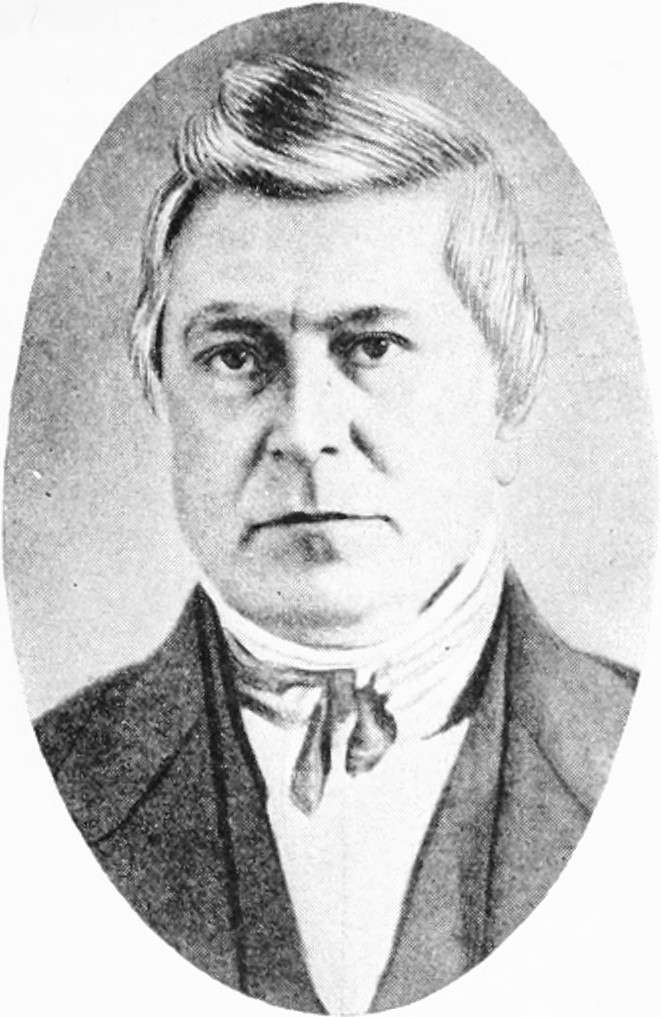

Member of the Ohio House of Representatives from Jefferson County
- In office 1820–1822
- In office 1816–1817

Personal details
- Born: February 20, 1787 Dergalt, County Tyrone, Kingdom of Ireland
- Died: October 17, 1850 (aged 63) Steubenville, Ohio, U.S.
- Spouse: Ann Adams
- Children: 10, including Joseph
- Relatives: T. Woodrow Wilson (grandson); Margaret W. Wilson (great-granddaughter); Jessie Wilson Sayre (great-granddaughter); Eleanor Wilson McAdoo (great-granddaughter); Francis B. Sayre Jr. (great-great-grandson); Eleanor A. Sayre (great-great-granddaughter)

James Wilson (February 20, 1787 – October 17, 1850) was an Irish-American journalist and politician. Wilson, who began his career working for the Philadelphia Aurora, later purchased the Western Herald and founded the Pennsylvania Advocate. Between 1816 and 1822, he served three one-year terms representing Jefferson County in the Ohio House of Representatives. Wilson was the paternal grandfather of President Woodrow Wilson.

== Life and career ==
Born in Dergalt, County Tyrone, Kingdom of Ireland (in modern Northern Ireland) in 1787, Wilson emigrated in his youth to the United States. He settled in Philadelphia, where he found work as a printer in the office of the Aurora, a Jeffersonian newspaper edited by William Duane. He rose to the position of foreman, publisher, and then editor. Continuing his journalistic career in Steubenville, Ohio, he purchased the Western Herald, which name he changed to Western Herald & Steubenville Gazette. He became involved in state politics, representing Jefferson County in the Ohio House of Representatives in 1816–1817, 1820–1821 and 1821–1822. In 1832, he founded the Pennsylvania Advocate, a newspaper serving Pittsburgh; he owned and edited it for a year before turning it over to his oldest son William Duane Wilson. Though not a lawyer, James Wilson served for several years as an associate judge for the Jefferson County common pleas court. Wilson died in Steubenville on 17 October 1850 from an attack of cholera. He was elected to the Ohio Journalism Hall of Fame in 1933.

== Family ==
Wilson married Ann Adams in Philadelphia in 1808. Both were of Scotch-Irish origin. They had seven sons and three daughters. The youngest son, Joseph Ruggles Wilson, born in Steubenville in 1822, was the father of Woodrow Wilson.

== Bibliography ==
- Guffey, Alexander S. (1941). "James Wilson". Colonel Edward Cook and Other Historical Papers. Pittsburgh: Privately printed. pp. 53–57.
- Ohio Journalism Hall of Fame: Proceedings of the Sixth and Seventh Annual Dinner Meetings of Judges, Newspapermen, and Others to Honor the Journalists Elected (PDF). Journalism Series. Vol. 12. Ohio State University Press. 1935.
- Walworth, Arthur (1965). Woodrow Wilson (Second Revised ed.). Boston: Houghton Mifflin.
- Weisenburger, Francis P. (December 1936). "The Middle Western Antecedents of Woodrow Wilson". The Mississippi Valley Historical Review. 23 (3): 375–390. doi:10.2307/1886371. JSTOR 1886371.
