= Wilson (1944 film) =

1944 film by Henry King

- Theatrical release poster
- Directed by: Henry King
- Written by: Lamar Trotti
- Produced by: Darryl F. Zanuck
- Starring: Alexander Knox; Charles Coburn; Geraldine Fitzgerald; Thomas Mitchell; Ruth Nelson; Sir Cedric Hardwicke; Vincent Price; William Eythe; Mary Anderson
- Cinematography: Leon Shamroy
- Edited by: Barbara McLean
- Music by: Alfred Newman
- Distributed by: 20th Century-Fox
- Release date: August 1, 1944
- Running time: 154 minutes
- Country: United States
- Language: English
- Budget: $5.2 million
- Box office: $3.103 million (U.S. and Canada rentals)

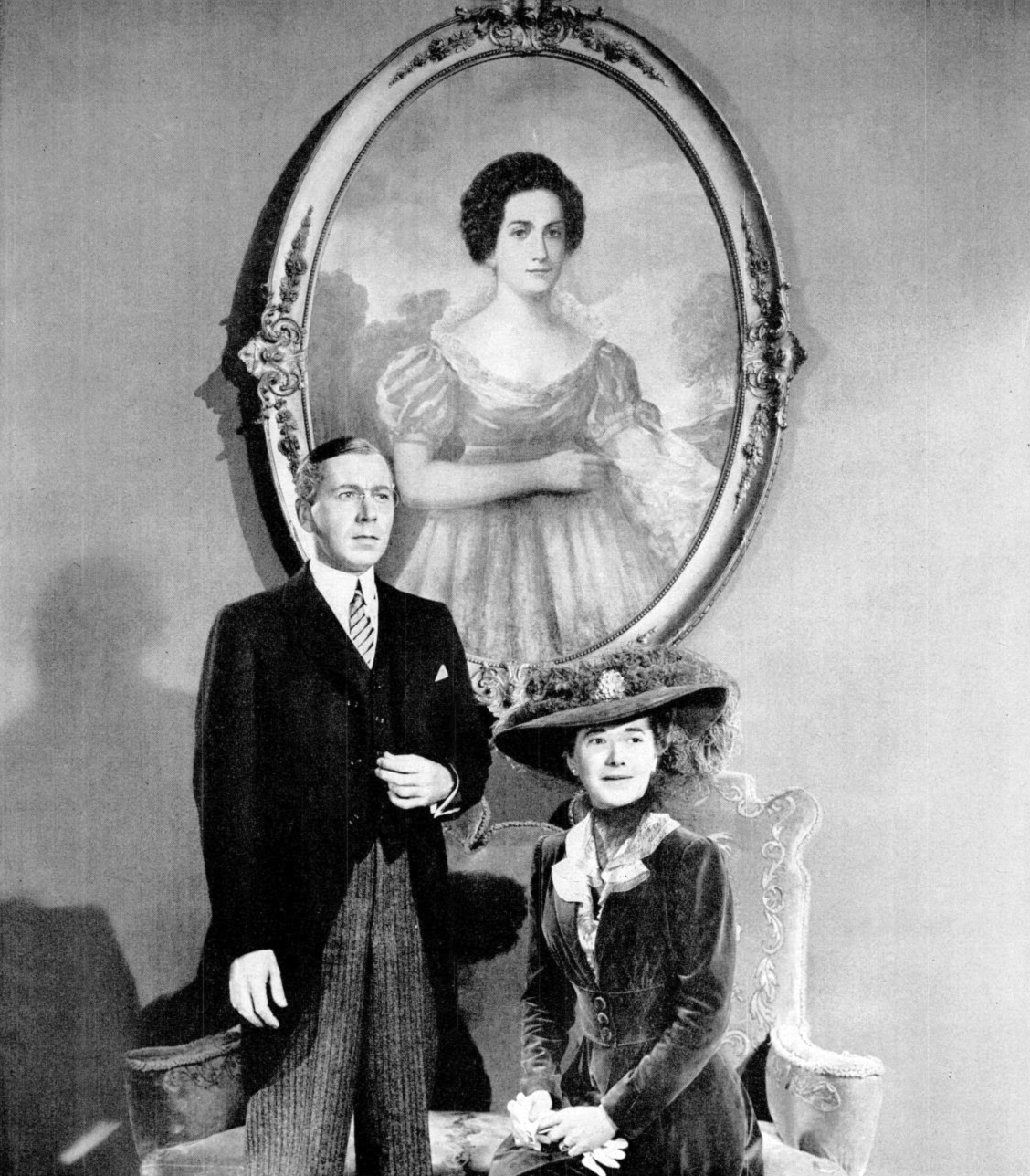
Alexander Knox and Ruth Nelson

Wilson is a 1944 American biographical film about Woodrow Wilson, the 28th president of the United States. Shot in Technicolor and directed by Henry King, the film stars Alexander Knox, Charles Coburn, Geraldine Fitzgerald, Thomas Mitchell, Ruth Nelson, Sir Cedric Hardwicke, Vincent Price, William Eythe and Mary Anderson. Darryl F. Zanuck, then head of 20th Century-Fox, was an ardent admirer of Wilson and personally oversaw production. Character actor Alexander Knox was cast in a rare leading role as Wilson who was nominated for the Academy Award for Best Actor for his performance.

Wilson received critical acclaim, earning ten nominations at the 17th Academy Awards and winning five, including Best Writing, Original Screenplay. However, it was a box office bomb due to its unusually high budget. Zanuck was so disappointed over the failure of the film that for years he forbade Fox employees from mentioning the film in his presence.

== Plot ==
In 1909, Woodrow Wilson is the president of Princeton University and the author of several books on the democratic process. The local Democratic Party political machine convinces him to run for governor of New Jersey. After he wins the election in 1910, Wilson proves himself independent of the machine and its interests, fighting for progressive causes.

The U.S. is going through a progressive change in national politics and a split is developing in the Republican Party, providing a chance for Wilson to win on the Democratic ticket. He receives the party's nomination and wins the presidency in 1912. He pushes through a series of programs, called 'The New Freedom'. When World War I breaks out in Europe in 1914, Wilson tries to keep the U.S. neutral. At the same time, his wife Ellen dies of Bright's disease.

Early in 1915, at around the same time of the sinking of the RMS Lusitania, he meets Edith Bolling Galt, a Washington D.C. widow, whom he marries in December 1915. He wins reelection in 1916, and as he starts his second term, the war finally comes to America. In 1918, the Allies defeat the Central Powers, and Wilson travels to France to have a hand in the Paris Peace Conference. He intends to establish his long-promised League of Nations, but many Republican senators, including Henry Cabot Lodge, feel the president is leaving the United States vulnerable to future wars, and decide to block whatever treaty he brings back.

President Wilson takes the issue to the people in a multi-state tour, but his health fails and days after returning to Washington, he suffers a stroke. Edith shields the president and screens visitors, leading some to question how powerful she is and how much Wilson is truly acting as president. In the end, Wilson recovers enough to see the election of Republican Warren G. Harding, who has promised to keep the country out of the League of Nations. As Wilson's administration ends, he laments his failure but remains hopeful that the League will, in some form or another, be successful in the future.

== Cast ==
- Alexander Knox as Woodrow Wilson
- Charles Coburn as Professor Henry Holmes
- Geraldine Fitzgerald as Edith Wilson
- Thomas Mitchell as Joseph Tumulty
- Ruth Nelson as Ellen Wilson
- Sir Cedric Hardwicke as Senator Henry Cabot Lodge
- Vincent Price as William G. McAdoo
- William Eythe as George Felton
- Mary Anderson as Eleanor Wilson
- Ruth Ford as Margaret Wilson
- Sidney Blackmer as Josephus Daniels
- Madeleine Forbes as Jessie Wilson
- Stanley Ridges as Admiral Grayson
- Eddie Foy Jr. as Eddie Foy
- Charles Halton as Colonel House
- Thurston Hall as Senator E.H. Jones aka James Smith Jr.
- J. M. Kerrigan as Edward Sullivan
- James Rennie as Jim Beeker
- Katherine Locke as Helen Bones
- Stanley Logan as Robert Lansing
- Marcel Dalio as Georges Clemenceau
- Edwin Maxwell as William Jennings Bryan
- Clifford Brooke as David Lloyd George
- Tonio Selwart as Count Johann Heinrich von Bernstorff
- John Ince as Senator Watson
- Charles Miller as Senator Bromfield
- Francis X. Bushman as Bernard Baruch (uncredited)
- Davison Clark as Champ Clark (uncredited)
- Eula Morgan as Singer (uncredited)
- Jess Lee Brooks as Simms, Georgia-born White House servant who welcomes ex-neighbor Ellen Wilson (uncredited)

== Production ==
=== Development ===
Wilson was initially intended as a historical drama about a fictional American family living during the Progressive Era before being rewritten by Lamar Trotti into a biopic about Woodrow Wilson. Wilson's daughter, Eleanor Wilson McAdoo, served as an informal counselor. Journalist Ray Stannard Baker, an authority on Wilson, served as an adviser.

=== Casting ===
Before Knox was cast as Wilson, Ronald Colman and Frank Conroy were considered. Claudette Colbert was also considered for one of Wilson's wives. Dwight Frye was cast as Secretary of War Newton D. Baker but died of a heart attack on November 7, 1943, a few days prior to his filming start. Ernest Palmer was hired as cinematographer but had to be replaced by Leon Shamroy after falling ill, while James Basevi quit as art director due to disagreements with the rest of the crew.

=== Filming ===
With a budget of $5.2 million, Wilson was the most expensive film produced by Fox at that time. Much of the budget went to constructing accurate and detailed sets for White House locations such as the East Room, the Blue Room, the Oval Office and the Lincoln Bedroom. Scenes of the Democratic National Convention were shot at Shrine Auditorium in Los Angeles while scenes set at Princeton were shot on-location in Trenton, New Jersey. Other scenes were shot at the Biltmore Theater in Los Angeles; Pueblo, Colorado; and Midwick Country Club in Alhambra, California.

== Reception and legacy ==
=== Box office ===
Wilson was promoted by the NBC Blue Network radio show Hall of Fame Broadcast with a radio adaptation of sections of the script.

Wilson reportedly lost $2 million for Fox. Ticket sales were damaged due to the United States Department of War prohibiting the film's exhibition on Armed Forces bases during World War II under provisions of the Soldier Voting Act against the screening of political material that could influence elections such as the ones about to be held on November 7, 1944.

The film's unusually high budget (US$5,200,000, equal to about US$90,000,000 today) caused 20th Century-Fox to ask a much higher rental price and an unusually high percentage of each admission, as confirmed by Variety: "Twentieth-Fox's deal on Wilson will call for advanced scales of 76c matinees and $1.10 evenings. Terms on Wilson, for which 20th is seeking quick release and dating, will be 60% straight from the first dollar but with a guarantee of 15% profit to the theatre. Twentieth-Fox will also demand extended playing time on Wilson." Theaters that usually charged 25 cents admission were forced to charge Fox's stipulated $1.10 admission (US$19.95 in 2025) for Wilson, keeping customers away in droves.

=== Critical response ===
The film received generally positive reviews but was not without its detractors. The New Republic film critic Manny Farber was particularly unenthusiastic, calling the production "costly, tedious and impotent" while writing: "The effect of the movie is similar to the one produced by the sterile post-card albums you buy in railroad stations, which unfold like accordions and show you the points of interest in the city ... The producers must have known far more about the World War, the peace-making at Versailles, and Wilson himself, but that is kept out of the movie in the same way that slum sections are kept out of post-card albums ... About three-quarters of the way through, a large amount of actual newsreel from the first World War is run off and the strength of it makes the film that comes before and after seem comical." In The Nation in 1944, critic James Agee wrote, "No matter how friendly I feel toward Wilson and the people who made it, any such review would amount chiefly to a specification of occupational psychosis. With the best intentions in the world, Hollywood took a character and a theme of almost Shakespearian complexity and grandeur, and reduced the character to an astutely played liberal assistant professor of economics; the theme to a few generalizations which every schoolboy has half-forgotten ... Every major problem, opportunity, and responsibility which the picture set its makers was, in other words, flunked—now through timidity, again through habitual half-blindness, and most of all perhaps through the desire to sell and ingratiate and essentially to render a two-and-a-half-hour apology for one sustained impulse of daring and disinterestedness."

President Franklin D. Roosevelt, a protege of Wilson's, screened the film for guests at the Second Quebec Conference in 1944. British Prime Minister Winston Churchill, however, was no fan. He excused himself in the middle of the film and went to bed.

=== Awards and nominations ===
Despite lackluster commercial performance, the film received ten nominations at the 17th Academy Awards, winning five:

- Best Art Direction-Interior Decoration, Color (Wiard Ihnen and Thomas Little)
- Best Cinematography, Color (Leon Shamroy)
- Best Film Editing (Barbara McLean)
- Best Sound, Recording (E. H. Hansen)
- Best Writing, Original Screenplay (Lamar Trotti)

Wilson was also nominated for:

- Best Picture (Darryl F. Zanuck)
- Best Director (Henry King)
- Best Actor in a Leading Role (Alexander Knox)
- Best Music, Scoring of a Dramatic or Comedy Picture (Alfred Newman)
- Best Effects, Special Effects (Fred Sersen and Roger Heman Sr.)

=== Preservation ===
The Academy Film Archive preserved Wilson in 2006.
