= List of weddings at the White House =

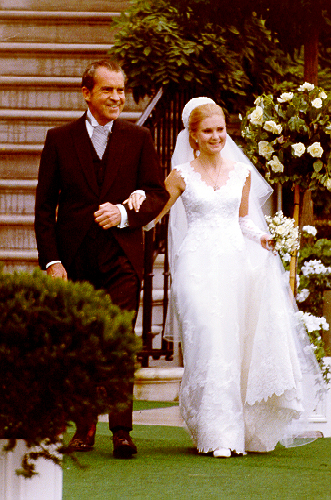
Tricia Nixon, escorted by her father, Richard Nixon, down the aisle at her wedding to Edward F. Cox in the White House Rose Garden, June 2, 1971

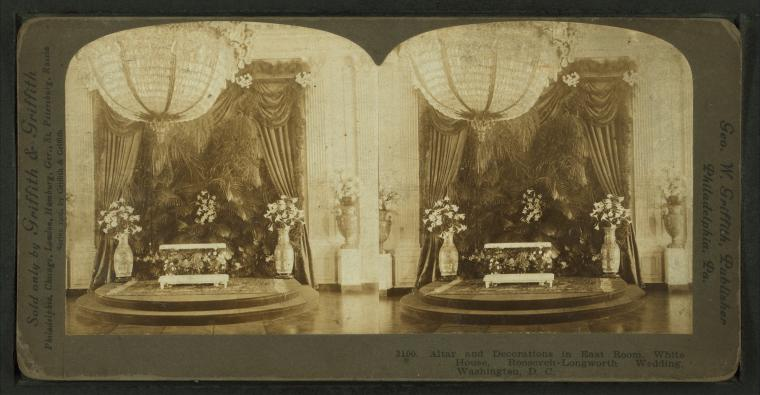
The East Room decorated for the wedding of Alice Roosevelt and Nicholas Longworth, 1906.

This is a list of weddings that have taken place at the White House, the official residence and workplace of the president of the United States.

== White House weddings ==
Nineteen couples have had documented weddings in the White House. Nine have been children of presidents, three have been a niece or nephew of the president or first lady, two siblings, two staffers, one granddaughter, one friend and one president. Of the twelve children of incumbent presidents who married during their father's presidency in locations other than the White House, two had receptions in the executive mansion.

Public weddings in the White House, particularly those of the president's children, "have been feel-good occasions for the country and the commander in chief, casting presidents in the sympathetic role of father." President-elect Richard Nixon encouraged his daughter, Julie, and her fiancé, David Eisenhower, grandson of Dwight D. Eisenhower, to postpone their December 1968 wedding at New York's Marble Collegiate Church and instead have it after his inauguration at the White House, but the couple did not wish for the publicity of a White House wedding. Her older sister, Tricia, is the most recent White House bride to be a child of the president.

These events are occasionally referred to in the press as "America's 'royal' weddings." The President is invoiced for the private event at personal expense, including flowers, event-specific staffing, and overtime, but White House staff may be directed to work on the wedding, such as their chefs, butlers, or calligraphy staff. The White House social secretary takes on wedding planning duties. Apart from weddings, the White House hosts hundreds of events annually.

== List of weddings at the White House ==
=== 19th century ===
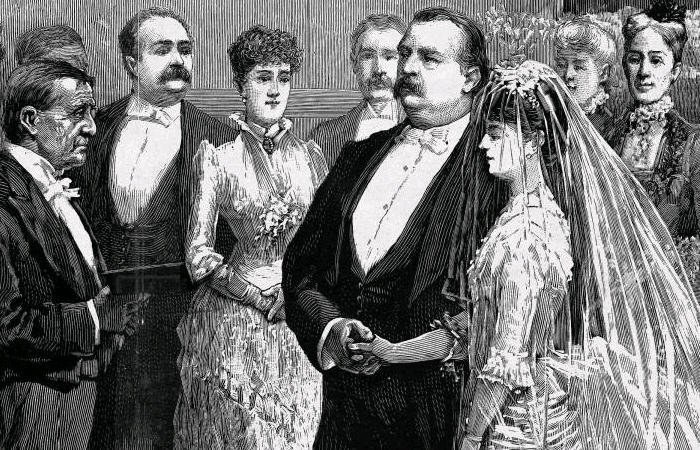
President Grover Cleveland marries Frances Folsom in the Blue Room, June 2, 1886.

- March 29, 1812: Lucy Payne Washington (sister of First Lady Dolley Madison) married Supreme Court Justice Thomas Todd. The first wedding at the White House.
- March 9, 1820: Maria Hester Monroe (daughter of President James Monroe) married her first cousin Samuel L. Gouverneur. The first wedding of a child of a president in the White House.
- February 25, 1828: John Adams II (son of President John Quincy Adams) married his first cousin Mary Catherine Hellen in the Blue Room. The first wedding of a grandchild of a president at the White House (grandson of President John Adams).
- April 10, 1832: Mary A. Eastin (niece of Rachel Jackson, late wife of President Andrew Jackson) married Lucius J. Polk in the East Room.
- November 29, 1832: Mary Anne Lewis (daughter of a close friend of President Andrew Jackson) married Alphonse Joseph Yves Pageot in the East Room. The first wedding in the White House of an individual not related to the first family. It was also the only Roman Catholic wedding ever held at the White House.
- January 31, 1842: Elizabeth Tyler (daughter of President John Tyler) married William Waller in the East Room.
- May 21, 1874: Nellie Grant (daughter of President Ulysses S. Grant) married Algernon Sartoris in the East Room.
- June 19, 1878: Emily Platt (niece of President Rutherford B. Hayes) married Russell Hastings in the Blue Room.
- June 2, 1886: President Grover Cleveland married Frances Folsom in the Blue Room. The only wedding of a president to take place in the White House.

=== 20th century ===
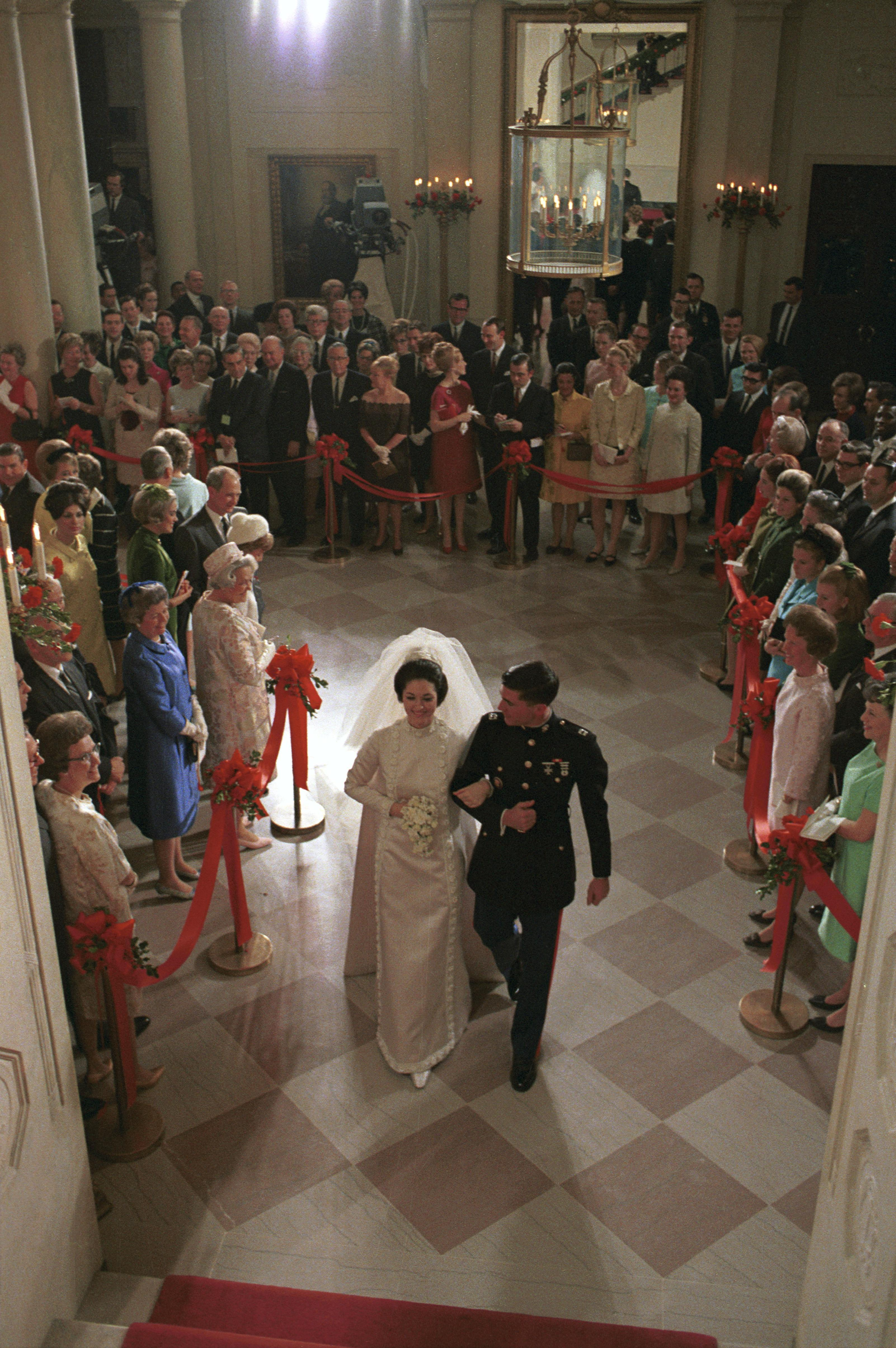
Wedding of Lynda Bird Johnson and Charles Spittal Robb, December 9, 1967

- February 17, 1906: Alice Roosevelt (daughter of President Theodore Roosevelt) married Nicholas Longworth in the East Room.
- November 25, 1913: Jessie Woodrow Wilson (daughter of President Woodrow Wilson) married Francis Bowes Sayre in the East Room.
- May 7, 1914: Eleanor Randolph Wilson (daughter of President Woodrow Wilson) married William Gibbs McAdoo in the Blue Room.
- August 7, 1918: Alice Wilson (niece of President Woodrow Wilson) married Isaac Stuart McElroy, Jr., in the Blue Room.
- July 30, 1942: Harry Hopkins (advisor to President Franklin D. Roosevelt) married Louise Gill Macy in the Yellow Oval Room.
- December 9, 1967: Lynda Bird Johnson (daughter of President Lyndon B. Johnson) married Charles Spittal Robb in the East Room.
- June 12, 1971: Tricia Nixon (daughter of President Richard Nixon) married Edward F. Cox in the Rose Garden. The first wedding outdoors at the White House.
- May 28, 1994: Anthony Rodham (brother of First Lady Hillary Clinton) married Nicole Boxer in the Rose Garden.

=== 21st century ===
- October 19, 2013: Pete Souza (Chief Official White House Photographer) married Patti Lease in the Rose Garden.
- November 19, 2022: Naomi Biden (granddaughter of President Joe Biden) married Peter Neal on the South Lawn. The first wedding of a grandchild of a sitting president at the White House.

== List of wedding receptions at the White House ==
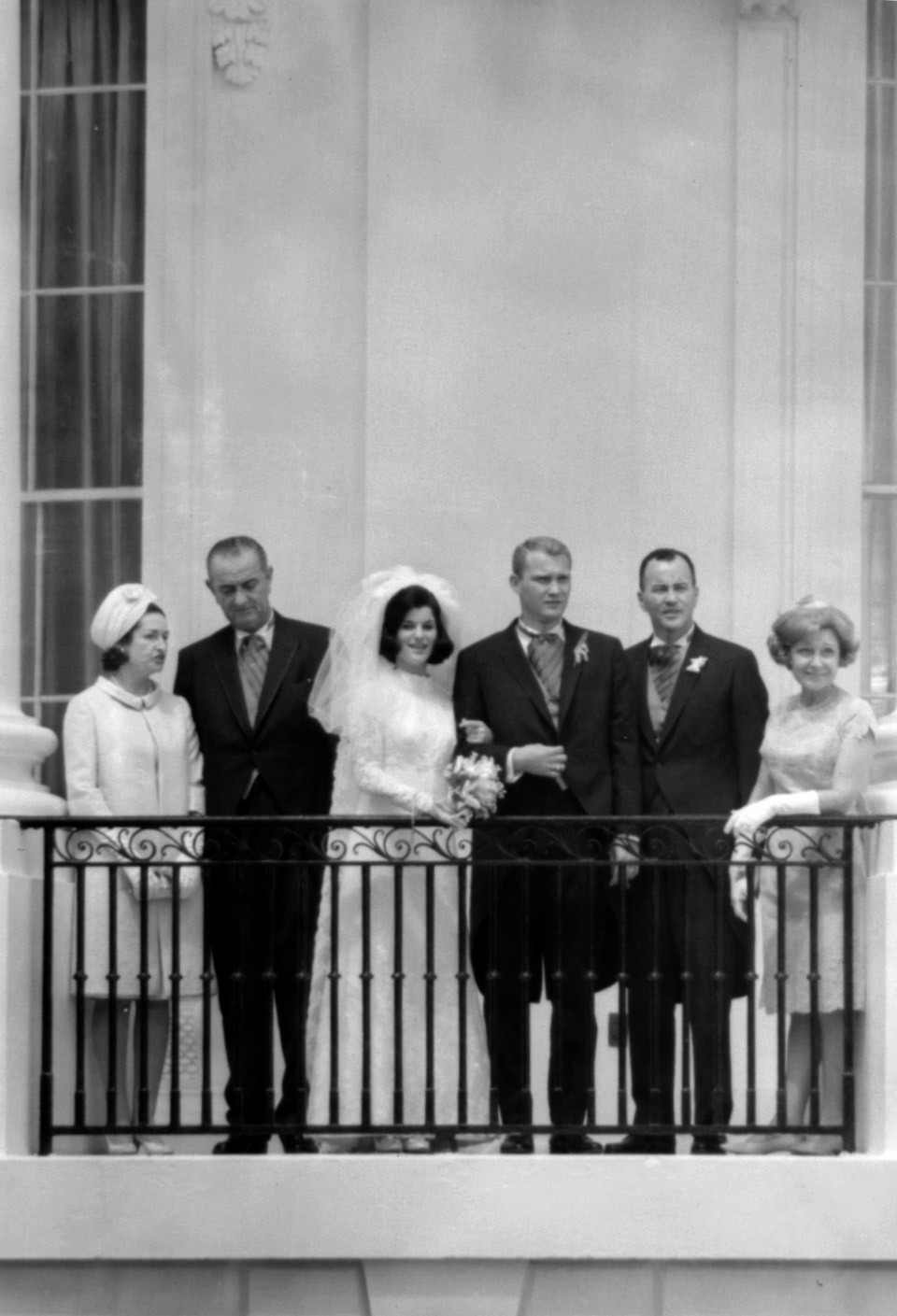
Luci Baines Johnson and Patrick Nugent and their parents on the south portico, August 6, 1966

- December 1, 1831: Andrew Jackson Jr. (son of President Andrew Jackson) married Sarah Yorke in Philadelphia on November 24, 1831, with a reception held a week later.
- June 29, 1844: President John Tyler married Julia Gardiner in New York at the Church of the Ascension on June 26, 1844, with a reception held a few days later.
- August 6, 1966: Luci Baines Johnson (daughter of President Lyndon B. Johnson) married Patrick Nugent at the National Shrine of the Immaculate Conception, with a reception for 700 guests held later that day.
- June 21, 2008: Jenna Bush (daughter of President George W. Bush) married Henry Chase Hager at Prairie Chapel Ranch on May 10, 2008, with a reception held six weeks later.
