= Francis Bowes Sayre =

Francis Bowes Sayre may refer to:

- Francis Bowes Sayre Sr. (1885–1972), professor at Harvard Law School
- Francis Bowes Sayre Jr. (1915–2008), Dean of the National Cathedral in Washington, USA
