= Helen Woodrow Bones =

Cousin of Woodrow Wilson (1874–1951)

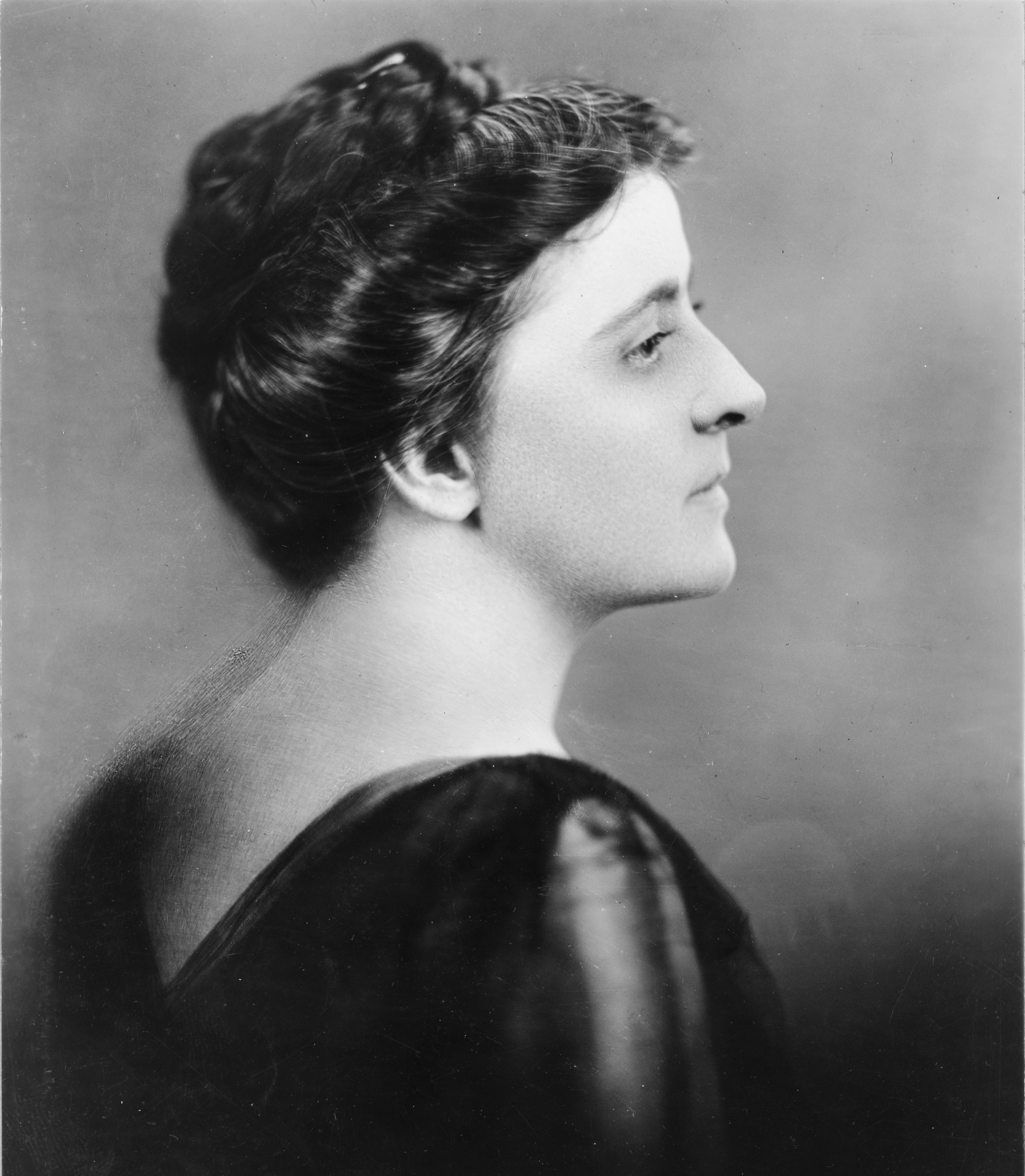
- Undated portrait of Bones, created between 1910 and 1920
- Born: October 31, 1874; Rome, Georgia, U.S.
- Died: June 4, 1951 (aged 76); Rome, Georgia, U.S.
- Occupations: Book editor, personal secretary
- Known for: Surrogate First Lady to her cousin Woodrow Wilson between the death of his first wife and his second marriage

Helen Woodrow Bones (October 31, 1874 – June 4, 1951) was Woodrow Wilson's first cousin and also, from her childhood, a friend of Wilson's first wife, Ellen. Bones moved to the White House as Ellen Wilson's private secretary after Wilson's 1912 election as US President. After Ellen Wilson's death in 1914, Bones served as a "surrogate First Lady" in the Wilson White House until his second marriage sixteen months later.

== Early life ==
Helen Woodrow Bones was born October 31, 1874, in Rome, Georgia. Her father, James William Bones, was a Presbyterian minister, and her mother, Marion Woodrow, was the sister of Woodrow Wilson's mother Jessie. The parents of Helen Bones and Woodrow Wilson had a close relationship, so that "the young cousins were intimates of each other's households."

Helen and her family were also close friends with the family of Ellen Axson (later Ellen Wilson), whose father was pastor of the Presbyterian Church in Rome, Georgia. During an 1883 visit to Bones's cousins in Georgia, Woodrow Wilson first met Ellen Axson in the home of Helen's older sister Jessie Bones Brower. This first meeting was followed by an impromptu picnic; eight-year-old Helen rode along on the young couple's seven-mile wagon trip to the picnic site.

Bones attended high school in Chicago, where her sister Jessie Brower lived. After graduation, she moved to Princeton, New Jersey, where she lived with Woodrow and Ellen Wilson and their family while attending Evelyn College for Women. According to one account of those years, she became "something of a fourth sister to the three Wilson daughters ... President Wilson especially liked to tease Helen Bones, and she felt free to "egg him on when he felt foolish, much to everyone's delight."

After finishing college, Bones began a career in the publishing industry, first in Chicago and later in New York City. She had been working there for more than a decade when, after Wilson's 1912 presidential election, Ellen Wilson asked her to move to Washington, D.C., with the family, as Ellen's private secretary.

== White House years ==
Left to right: Helen Woodrow Bones, Cary T. Grayson, and Eleanor Wilson

Helen Woodrow Bones moved into the White House in 1913 where her first job as Ellen Wilson's private secretary was to organize tickets for inauguration events. According to Wilson's daughter Eleanor:

We all breathed sighs of relief and pleasure when she arrived. She worked like a small steam engine plowing through stacks of letters and she still teased and laughed with father, as she had done in the old days…Her room was always a sort of rendezvous; the door was open all day long, and we drifted in and out, sometimes ending the day with an impromptu tea around her fire…

Bones played multiple roles in the early Wilson White House; she was part of Ellen's secretarial staff but also her close personal friend and supporter, and she combined many social duties with administrative responsibilities. Ellen Wilson's health began to deteriorate in early 1914, and Bones took on additional hostess duties in the White House, which continued after Ellen's death in August of that year. Bones shared the role of "surrogate First Lady" with the Wilsons' daughter Margaret, her primary job being to support the grieving widower. Within months, Bones's health also began to deteriorate under the pressure of Wilson's grief and her own. For therapy, the President's doctor suggested that she take up walking and recommended as her companion an elegant widowed socialite and businesswoman named Edith Galt.

Bones and Galt soon became frequent walking companions. On March 18, 1915, Bones invited her to tea at the White House on a day when Wilson would be out playing golf. Wilson returned early, however, and decided to join them. Wilson married Edith on December 18, 1915, 16 months after the death of his first wife.

Bones remained part of the Wilson household during the 1916 presidential election and the Wilsons' return to the White House. She took an active role in volunteer work during World War I along with Edith.

== Later life ==
In early 1919, Bones moved out of the White House to resume her career as a book publishing editor in New York City. She remained on friendly terms with the Wilson family and was invited by Edith Wilson in 1924 to take part with the family in Woodrow Wilson's funeral. After retiring, she moved back to her childhood home in Rome, Georgia, where she died on June 4, 1951.
