= Francis Bowes Sayre Jr. =

American priest (1915–2008)

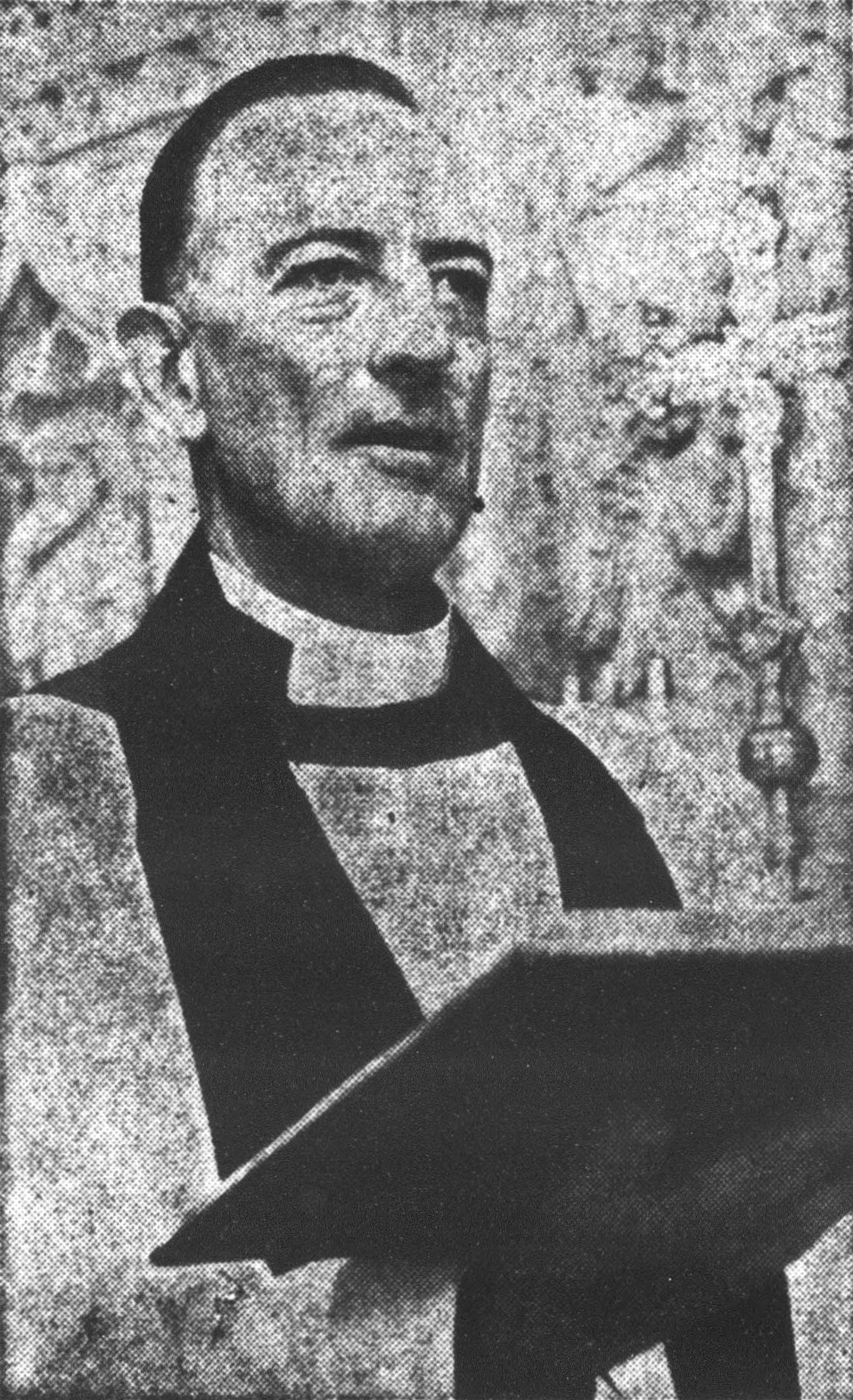
- Rev. Sayre in 1961
- Born: January 17, 1915; White House, Washington, D.C., U.S.
- Died: October 3, 2008 (aged 93); Martha's Vineyard, Massachusetts, U.S.
- Resting place: Ashes interred at the Washington National Cathedral
- Education: Williams College; Union Theological Seminary
- Occupations: Priest, civil rights activist
- Spouse: Harriet Taft Hart (m. 1946; died 2003)
- Children: 4
- Parent(s): Francis Bowes Sayre Sr. Jessie Wilson Sayre
- Relatives: James Wilson (great-great-grandfather); Joseph R. Wilson (great-grandfather); Robert H. Sayre (grandfather); Woodrow Wilson (grandfather); Ellen Axson Wilson (grandmother); Edith Galt Wilson (step-grandmother); Thomas C. Hart (father-in-law); Margaret W. Wilson (aunt); Eleanor Wilson McAdoo (aunt); Eleanor A. Sayre (sister)

Francis Bowes Sayre Jr. (January 17, 1915 – October 3, 2008) was Dean of the Washington National Cathedral in Washington, D.C., for 27 years. He was the eldest grandchild of Woodrow Wilson, the 28th president of the United States.

He was a vocal opponent of segregation, poverty, McCarthyism, and the Vietnam War. In March 1965, he joined Martin Luther King Jr. on the voting-rights march from Selma to Montgomery, Alabama. Sayre was unafraid to denounce Senator Joseph McCarthy during the height of the latter's influence in the 1950s. In 1954, Sayre called McCarthy a "pretended patriot", adding "There is a devilish indecision about any society that will permit an impostor like McCarthy to caper out front while the main army stands idly by."

== Early life and education ==
Francis Bowes Sayre Jr. was born in the White House on January 17, 1915, the first-born grandchild of President Woodrow Wilson. Sayre's father, Francis Bowes Sayre Sr., was a Harvard University law professor who later became an assistant secretary of state, and his paternal grandfather, Robert H. Sayre, was vice president and chief engineer of the Lehigh Valley Railroad. His mother was President Wilson's daughter, Jessie Woodrow Wilson Sayre.

He graduated from Belmont Hill School and Williams College and received his divinity degree from the Union Theological Seminary. He was a chaplain in the United States Navy during World War II and later had a parish in Cleveland.

== Marriage ==
In 1946, Sayre married Harriet Taft Hart (died 2003), daughter of Admiral Thomas C. Hart. They had four children.

== Death ==
Sayre retired as Dean in 1978. He died three decades later, on October 3, 2008, aged 93, at his home on Martha's Vineyard from diabetes. His ashes were interred later that month at the National Cathedral, where he had held the position of Dean and where he has been memorialized. He was survived by two daughters, two sons, and eight grandchildren.

== Awards and honors ==
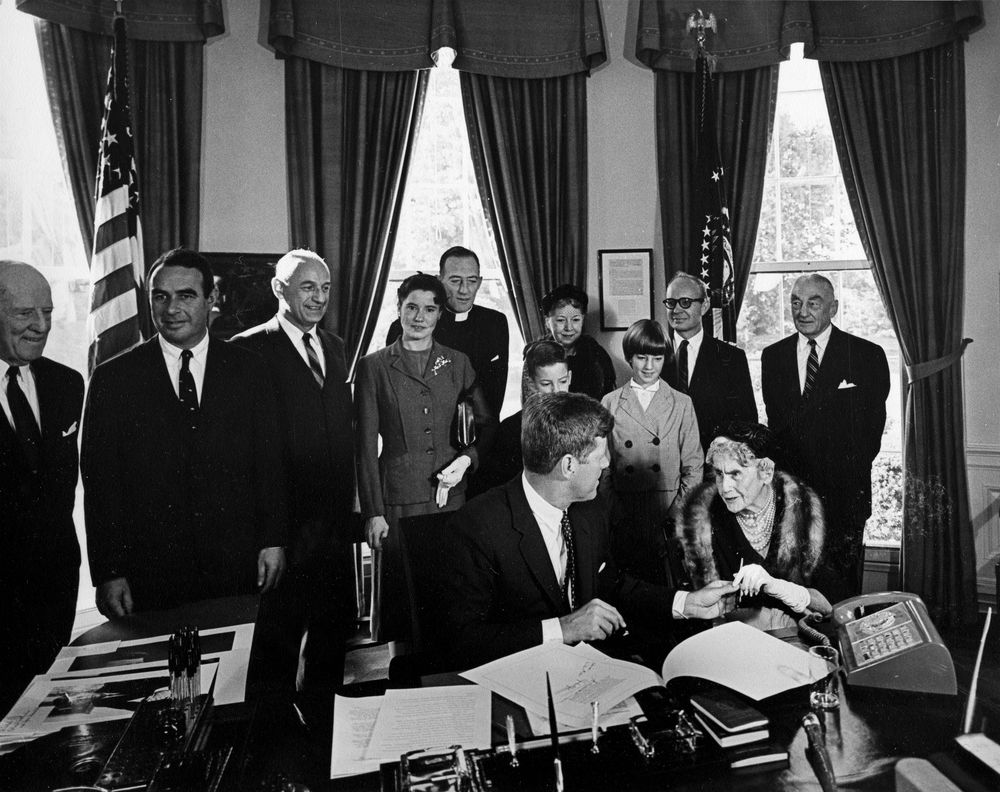
President John F. Kennedy signs S.J. Res. 51, authoring the creation of the Woodrow Wilson Memorial Commission, a commission to plan for the construction of a permanent memorial to President Woodrow Wilson in Washington, D.C. Seated (L – R): President Kennedy; Edith Wilson, wife of President Wilson. Standing (L – R): Francis B. Sayre, son-in-law of President Wilson; Senator Harrison A. Williams (New Jersey); Congressman Frank C. Osmers Jr. (New Jersey); Harriet Sayre, wife of Reverend Francis B. Sayre, Jr.; Reverend Sayre, grandson of President Wilson; Tom Sayre, Reverend Sayre's son (partially hidden); Margaret C. Brown, personal secretary to Mrs. Wilson; Jessie Sayer, Reverend Sayre's daughter; Under Secretary of the Interior John A. Carver Jr.; Arthur Sweetser, Director of the Woodrow Wilson Foundation. Oval Office, White House, Washington, D.C.

Sayre was awarded permanent, honorary membership at The Guild of Carillonneurs in North America in 1964. The organization sought to recognize his work in overseeing the purchase and construction of the 53-bell carillon at Washington National Cathedral.
