= Robert Sayre =

Robert Sayre may refer to:

- Robert H. Sayre (1824–1907), vice president and chief engineer of the Lehigh Valley Railroad
- Robert M. Sayre (1924–2016), American diplomat
- Robert Sayre, involved in Atom (web standard)#Atom 1.0 and IETF standardization
