= The Present Day Club =

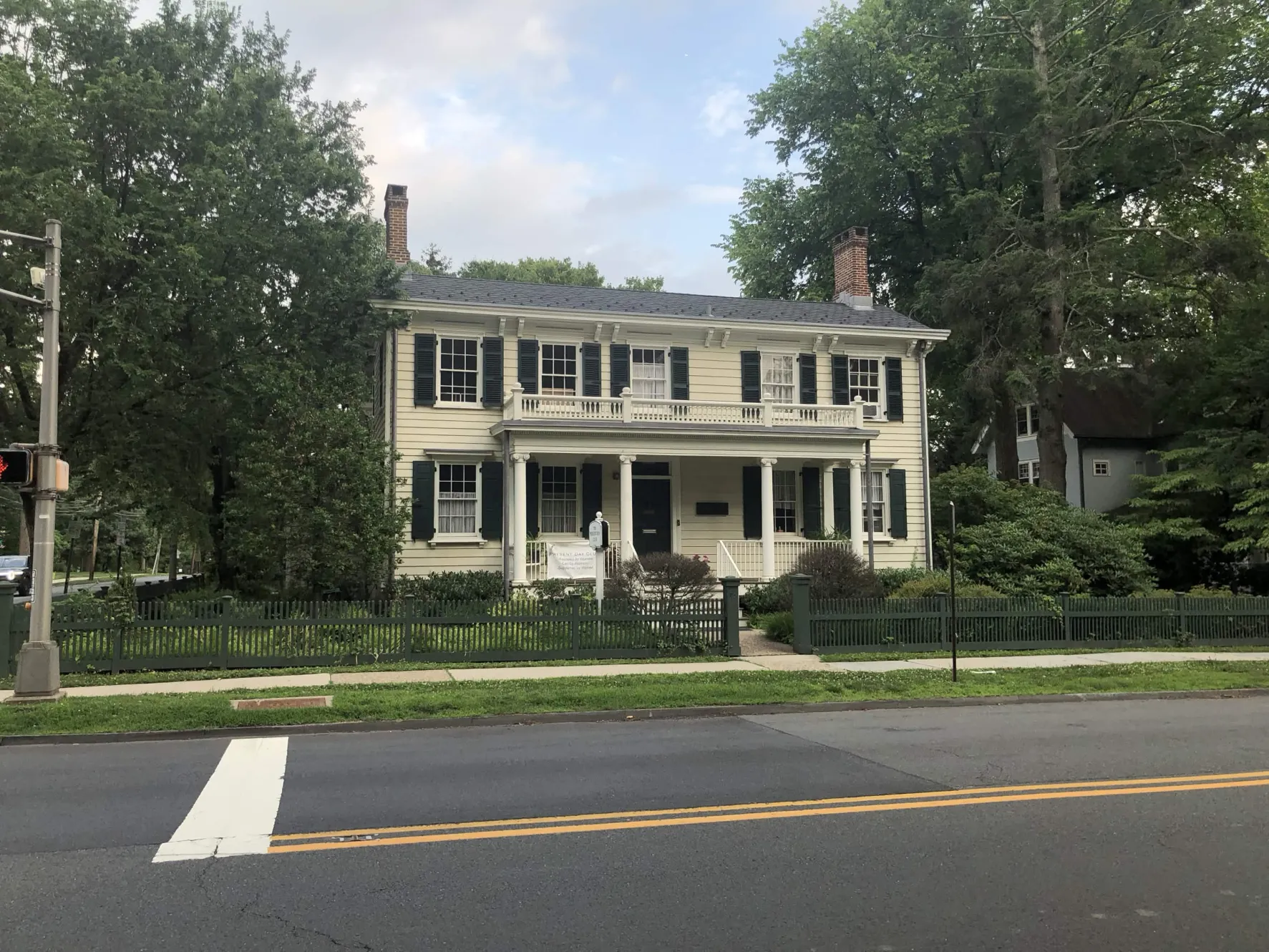
- Formation: February 18, 1898; 128 years ago
- Headquarters: 72 Stockton Street, Princeton, New Jersey, U.S.
- Website: presentdayclub.org

The Present Day Club is a private women's club located in Princeton, New Jersey. Founded in 1898, it is a traditional women's civic and social organization to provide an intellectual and social forum for women, with a stated purpose "to stimulate an interest in science, literature, art, and social and ethical culture."

== History ==
The club was organized on February 18, 1898 by a group of women in Princeton. Among its founders was Ellen Axson Wilson, the first wife of Woodrow Wilson, who was then a professor at Princeton University.

During the late 19th century, women's clubs emerged across the United States to emphasize women's education and social reform outside domestic life. The name "Present Day Club" was chosen to reflect the founders' intent to focus on contemporary current events and modern technology. At inception, annual dues were set at $5.

Initially, the club used rooms provided by Princeton University. As membership grew, the organization transitioned through rented spaces around Princeton, including a location on Chambers Street.

=== Clubhouse ===
In 1930, the organization purchased its permanent clubhouse at 72 Stockton Street. The house was built circa 1835 and is a building that is part of Princeton's Mercer Hill Historic District.

The house was designed by Charles Steadman, a 19th-century builder-architect responsible for multiple residential structures in Princeton. Following its purchase for $45,000, the building was expanded to add a lecture auditorium, a stage, and a kitchen.
