= Eleanor Sayre =

American curator and art historian (1916–2001)

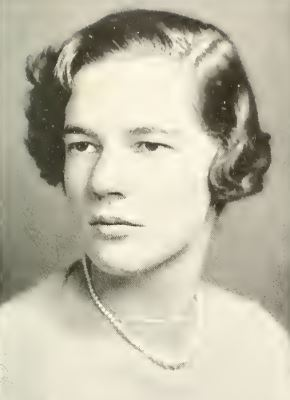
- 1938, Bryn Mawr College
- Born: Eleanor Axson Sayre; March 26, 1916; Philadelphia, Pennsylvania, U.S.
- Died: May 12, 2001 (aged 85); Cambridge, Massachusetts, U.S.
- Other names: Eleanor A. Sayre
- Education: Bryn Mawr College (BA)
- Occupation(s): Museum curator, art historian
- Years active: 1940–1991
- Parents: Jessie Woodrow Wilson; Francis Bowes Sayre Sr.
- Relatives: Francis Bowes Sayre Jr. (brother); Ellen Axson Wilson (grandmother); Woodrow Wilson (grandfather)
- Awards: Gold Medal of Merit in the Fine Arts
- Honours: Order of Isabella the Catholic

Eleanor Axson Sayre (March 26, 1916 – May 12, 2001) was an American curator, art historian, and a specialist on the works of Goya. She was the first woman to serve as departmental curator at the Museum of Fine Arts, Boston. Working as curator of prints and drawings, she collected Goya's etchings from museums around the world to catalogue and create international exhibits. She was awarded a knighthood with the Lazo de Dama in the Order of Isabella the Catholic by Spain in 1975 and the Gold Medal of Merit in the Fine Arts in 1991.

== Early life ==
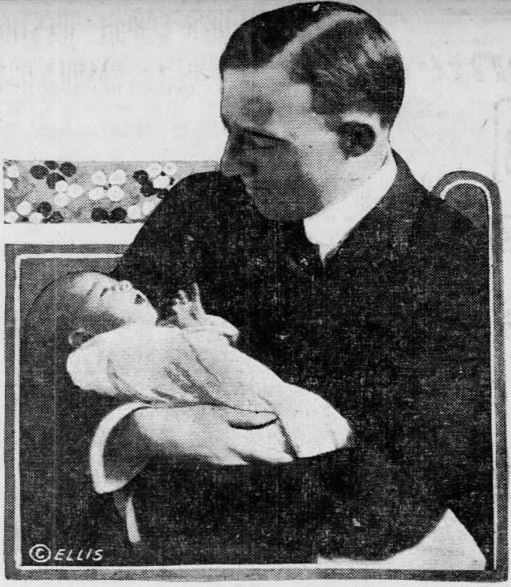
Sayre as an infant with her father, Francis, April 1916

Eleanor Axson Sayre was born on March 26, 1916, at Jefferson Hospital in Philadelphia, Pennsylvania to Jessie Woodrow (née Wilson) and Francis Bowes Sayre, Sr. She was the granddaughter of President Woodrow Wilson, who served as her godfather at her christening on 11 November 1916 at St. John's Protestant Episcopal Church in Williamstown, Massachusetts. Her mother was active with the YWCA and women's rights organizations, while her father was a law professor at Harvard Law School and later the Assistant Secretary of State, under President Franklin D. Roosevelt, and a diplomat. When she was three years old, the family relocated from Williamstown to Cambridge, Massachusetts, and then in 1923, moved to Siam, where Sayre's father worked as an advisor to the Siamese government, until 1929, when they returned to Cambridge. She studied art at Bryn Mawr College, graduating with a bachelor's degree in 1938. While looking for a summer job, after graduation, Sayre interviewed with Paul J. Sachs at Harvard University's Fogg Art Museum and was hired to work in the print department. Finding that she enjoyed working with prints, Sayer enrolled in graduate courses at Harvard, where she studied for two years under Sachs. She also developed an interest in Goya when Philip Hofer, founder of Harvard's department of printing and graphic arts suggested she might find the artist interesting.

== Career ==
Sayre began her career at the Yale University Art Gallery and in 1942 continued her career with a brief post at the Lyman Allyn Museum in New London, Connecticut. That same year, she was hired as an assistant curator in the education department and worked at the Rhode Island School of Design Museum in Providence. In 1945, she joined the staff of the Boston Museum of Fine Arts, working under Henry Rossiter. In 1951 when Rossiter bought the proofs of Goya's series The Disasters of War, which had at one time been owned by Sir William Stirling-Maxwell, 9th Baronet, Sayre began studying the prints. In 1954, she secured a grant from the American Philosophical Society to conduct research in Spain on Goya's prints. Five years later, in 1959, she identified "the earliest known drawing by Goya" in a folio containing what had been tagged as sporting prints from England.

In 1960, Sayre was promoted to assistant curator of prints and drawings and in 1963, she was awarded a Ford Foundation grant to return to Spain to make further study of Goya's works. That same year, she identified a Goya miniature and was able to authenticate its pedigree, prompting the MFA to purchase the piece. In 1967, she became the curator of prints and drawings when Rossiter retired, making her the first woman to head a department at the Museum since it was founded 97 years earlier. With her staff of six employees, Sayer aimed to improve the holdings of the museum. Among exhibits which she prepared were 300 Dürer prints from the collection of Tomás Harris and a collection of Rembrandt prints. Beginning in the 1970s, she taught print seminars at Harvard and in 1971 wrote Late Caprichos by Goya: Fragments from a Series, as her commentary and notes on a series of works by Goya. She developed an innovative exchange with Hugh MacAndrew from the Ashmolean Museum, where the two spent 1975 living in each other's homes and working each other's careers.

That same year, Sayre assembled an exhibition of 255 Goya works called The Changing Image: Prints by Francisco Goya which illustrated how the artist developed an idea from the preliminary study of a subject through the final printed version. To create the exhibit, she joined holdings from the Boston MFA with drawings from Madrid's Museo del Prado and proofs borrowed from the Art Institute of Chicago, the Biblioteca Nacional de España, and the British Museum. Included were the graphic images of the devastation of war in the series called Disasters, his prints depicting vices plaguing Spain which were called Caprichos (capriciousness), the series demonstrating the absurdity of humanity named Disparates (nonsense), and his works recording the history of the bullfight, known as Tauromaquia. The traveling exhibit was presented at various international museums, including the National Gallery of Canada and the Lang Gallery of Claremont Colleges, near Los Angeles, California. In appreciation of her scholarship on Goya, Sayre was awarded the Lazo de Dama of the Order of Isabella the Catholic from the Spanish crown in 1975.

In 1977, Sayre curated an exhibit on Beatrix Potter, combining drawings and book illustrations with a mini-zoo, provided by the Boston park system. Retiring in 1984, she continued to support the MFA as curator emeritus, organizing Goya and the Spirit of Enlightenment in 1989 for the museum. Once again, calling on worldwide museums, such as the Prado and the Metropolitan Museum of Art, she worked with Alfonso Pérez Sánchez, director of the Prado, to create the scholarly catalogue and exhibit featuring 200 of Goya's works. The catalogue explored how Goya's images serve to reflect the philosophical and political realities of his time. In 1991, she was awarded the Gold Medal of Merit in the Fine Arts by Juan Carlos I, King of Spain.

== Death and legacy ==
Sayre died in her home at Cambridge, Massachusetts on May 12, 2001. She was known during her lifetime as the "foremost American authority on Goya's graphic work".
