= Jessie Wilson Sayre =

American presidential daughter and activist (1887–1933)

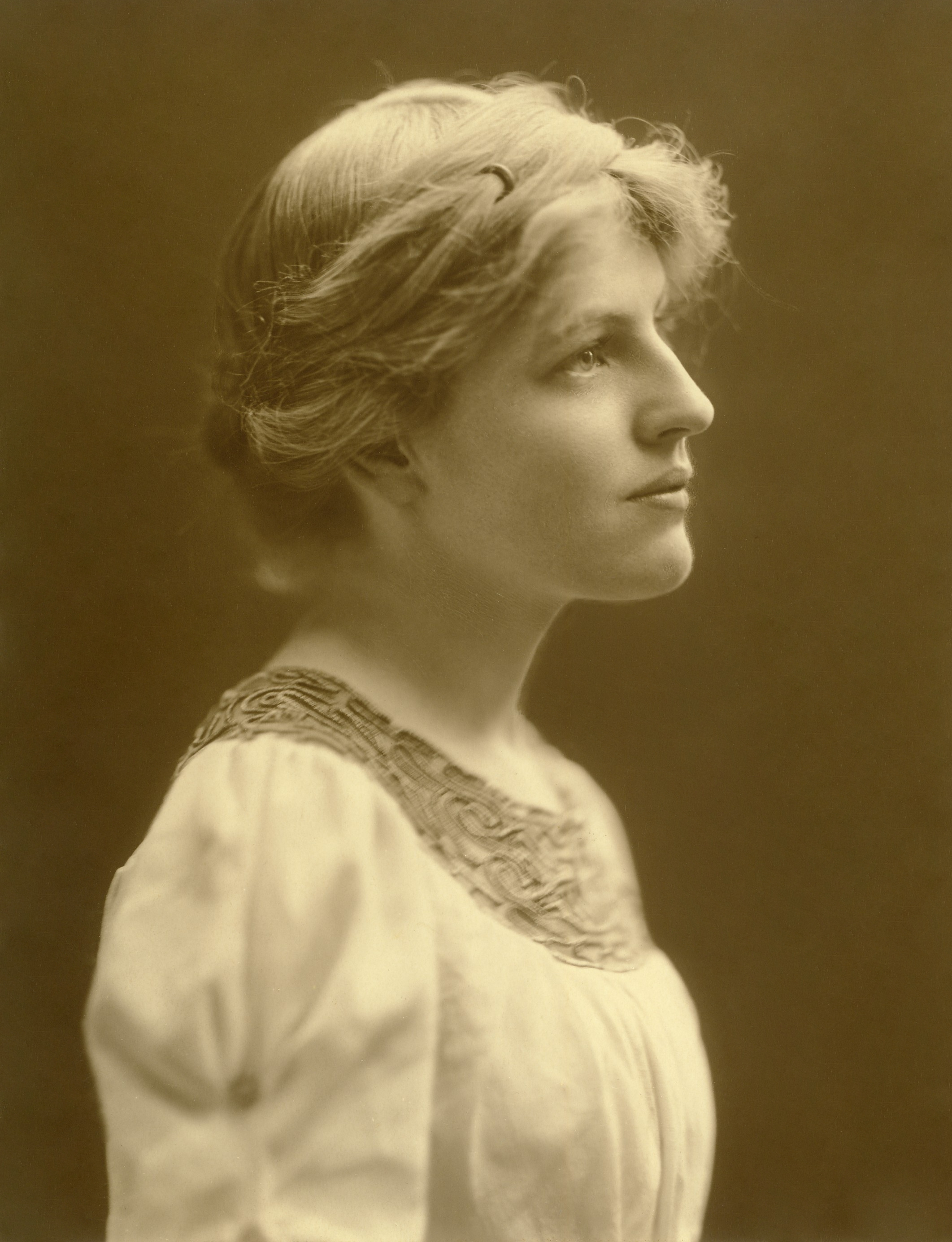
- Jessie Woodrow Wilson
- Born: Jessie Woodrow Wilson; August 28, 1887; Gainesville, Georgia, U.S.
- Died: January 15, 1933 (aged 45); Cambridge, Massachusetts, U.S.
- Resting place: Nisky Hill Cemetery
- Education: Goucher College (BA)
- Political party: Democratic
- Spouse: Francis Bowes Sayre Sr. (m. 1913)
- Children: 3, including Francis Jr. and Eleanor
- Parents: Woodrow Wilson; Ellen Axson Wilson
- Relatives: Eleanor Wilson McAdoo (sister); Margaret Woodrow Wilson (sister); Joseph Ruggles Wilson (grandfather)

Jessie Woodrow Sayre (née Wilson; August 28, 1887 – January 15, 1933) was a political activist and a daughter of US President Woodrow Wilson and Ellen Louise Axson. She worked for women's suffrage, social issues, to promote her father's call for the creation of the League of Nations, and was significant in the Massachusetts Democratic Party during the 1920s.

== Biography ==
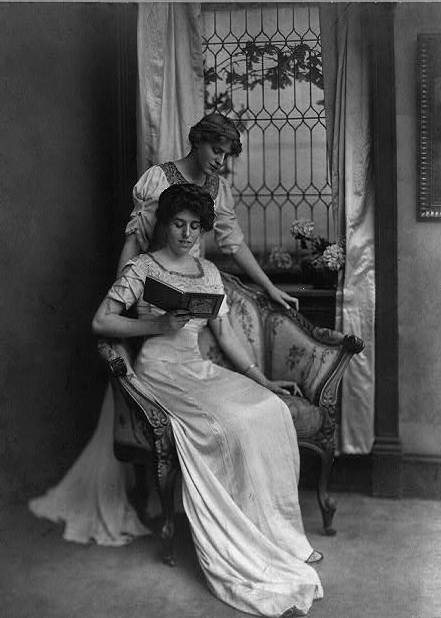
Jessie Wilson, standing, and her sister, Eleanor R. Wilson.

Jessie Woodrow Wilson was born in Gainesville, Georgia, the second daughter of Woodrow and Ellen Axson Wilson. She was the middle sister of Margaret Woodrow Wilson and Eleanor Wilson McAdoo. She was educated privately in Princeton, New Jersey at Miss Fine's School and at Goucher College in Baltimore, Maryland. She was a member of Gamma Phi Beta sorority. After her graduation from Goucher, she worked at a settlement home in Philadelphia for three years.

=== White House years ===
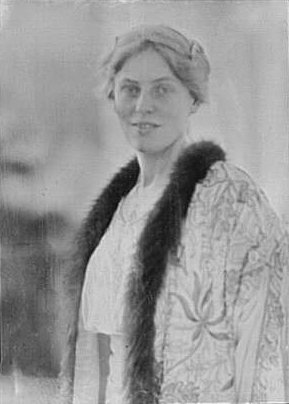
Wilson, Jessie (Mrs. Francis B. Sayre), portrait photograph, 1913

In July 1913, four months after her father assumed the presidency, the Wilsons announced Jessie's engagement to Francis Bowes Sayre, Sr. Her fiancé, a 1911 graduate of Harvard Law School, was the son of Robert Sayre, builder of the Lehigh Valley Railroad and organizer and general manager of the Bethlehem Iron Works. At the time of their engagement he was serving in the office of a district attorney. Their November 25, 1913, wedding was the thirteenth White House wedding, and the first since Alice Roosevelt and Nicholas Longworth were wed in 1906.

Upon their return from their honeymoon in Europe, they moved to Williamstown, Massachusetts, where her husband began his service as an assistant to the president of Williams College.

On January 17, 1915, she gave birth in the White House to a son, Francis B. Sayre, Jr. (January 17, 1915 – October 3, 2008), who became a noted clergyman and was a social activist like his mother. The following year, a daughter, Eleanor Axson Sayre (March 26, 1916 – May 12, 2001), was born. In 1919 they were joined by Woodrow Wilson Sayre (February 22, 1919 – September 16, 2002).

=== Massachusetts and Siam ===
After World War I, the Sayres moved to Cambridge, Massachusetts, where Francis accepted a position on the Harvard Law School faculty. There, she worked in the interests of the Democratic Party, the League of Nations, and the League of Women Voters. She was also involved with the YWCA, serving on its national board. At the time of Woodrow Wilson's death in 1924, the couple were living in Siam (now Thailand) where Francis was working as an advisor on international law at the Royal Court of Siam.

In 1928, she made the introductory speech for presidential nominee Al Smith at the Democratic National Convention. In 1929 her name was mentioned as a candidate for the Democratic nomination for United States Senator, for the seat then held by Republican Frederick H. Gillett. However, she declined. She became secretary of the Massachusetts Democratic State Committee instead.

=== Death ===
Sayre died at age 45 after undergoing abdominal surgery at Cambridge Hospital in Cambridge, Massachusetts. Some reports state that she suffered from a gall bladder disorder, while others state that she had undergone an emergency appendectomy. Two years later, the Boston branch of the Women's Democratic League was renamed the Jessie Woodrow Sayre Women's Democratic League.

She is buried in Nisky Hill Cemetery in Bethlehem, Pennsylvania.
