= Ellen Axson Wilson =

First Lady of the United States from 1913 to 1914

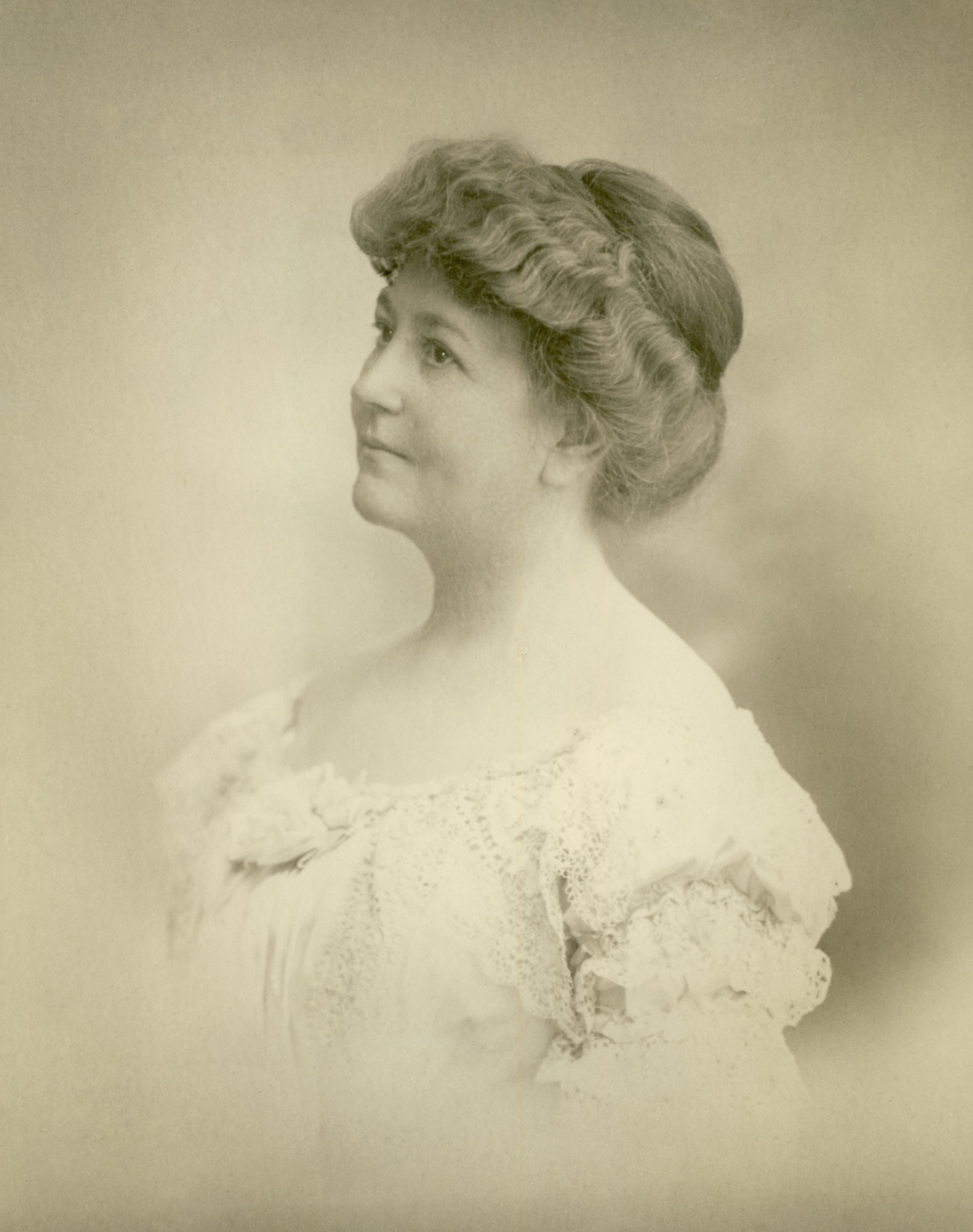
- Ellen Axson Wilson, photographed in 1910

First Lady of the United States
- In role March 4, 1913 – August 6, 1914
- President: Woodrow Wilson
- Preceded by: Helen Herron Taft
- Succeeded by: Margaret Woodrow Wilson

First Lady of New Jersey
- In role January 17, 1911 – March 1, 1913
- Governor: Woodrow Wilson
- Preceded by: Charlotte Fort
- Succeeded by: Mabel Fielder (acting)

Personal details
- Born: Ellen Louise Axson; May 15, 1860 Savannah, Georgia, U.S.
- Died: August 6, 1914 (aged 54) Washington, D.C., U.S.
- Cause of death: Bright's Disease
- Resting place: Myrtle Hill Cemetery
- Spouse: Woodrow Wilson (m. 1885)
- Children: Margaret; Jessie; Eleanor

Ellen Louise Axson Wilson (née Axson; May 15, 1860 – August 6, 1914) was First Lady of the United States from 1913 until her death in 1914, as the first wife of President Woodrow Wilson. Like her husband, she was a Southerner, as well as the daughter of a clergyman. She was born in Savannah, Georgia, but raised in Rome, Georgia. Having an artistic bent, she studied at the Art Students League of New York before her marriage, and continued to produce art in later life.

During her tenure as First Lady, she arranged White House weddings for two of their daughters. She was the third First Lady and the most recent to die during her tenancy.

== Biography ==
Ellen Louise Axson, born in Savannah, Georgia, was the daughter of the Reverend Samuel Edward Axson, a Presbyterian minister, and his wife Margaret Jane (née Hoyt) Axson. Ellen became a woman of refined tastes with a fondness for art, music, and literature. When she was eleven years old, she began studying art at Rome Female College in Rome, Georgia. After her graduation in 1876, Ellen's drawing titled School Scene was submitted to the Paris International Exposition. where it won a bronze medal for excellence.

In April 1883, she met Woodrow Wilson when he was visiting his cousin Jesse Woodrow Wilson in Rome, Georgia, on family business. At that time, she was keeping house for her widowed father. Woodrow Wilson thought of Ellen, "What splendid laughing eyes!" They were engaged 5 months later, but postponed the wedding while he did postgraduate work at Johns Hopkins University and she nursed her ailing father. Ellen's father committed suicide while hospitalized for depression, after which she went North to study at the Art Students League of New York.

Wilson, who was 28 years of age, married Ellen, age 25, on June 24, 1885, at her paternal grandparents' home in Savannah, Georgia. The wedding was performed jointly by his father, the Reverend Joseph R. Wilson, and her grandfather, the Reverend Isaac Stockton Keith Axson. They honeymooned at Waynesville, a mountain resort in western North Carolina.

That same year, Bryn Mawr College in Pennsylvania offered Dr. Wilson a teaching position at an annual salary of $1,500. He and his bride lived near the campus, keeping her little brother Eddie with them.

Together, the Wilsons had three daughters:

- Margaret Woodrow Wilson (1886–1944) - singer, businesswoman, Hindu nun (1940–44)
- Jessie Woodrow Wilson (1887–1933) - she worked three years at a settlement house in Philadelphia. She married Francis B. Sayre at the White House in 1913. They settled at Cambridge, Massachusetts, when Sayre joined the faculty of Harvard Law School. Jessie was active in the League of Women Voters, the YWCA, and as secretary of the Massachusetts Democratic Committee.
- Eleanor Randolph Wilson (1889–1967) - she married Secretary of the Treasury William Gibbs McAdoo.

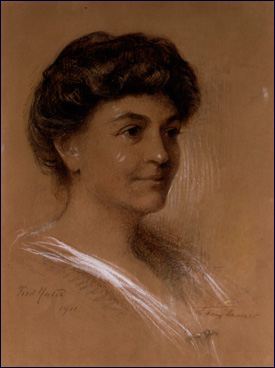
Ellen Axson Wilson by her friend Frederic Yates - 1906

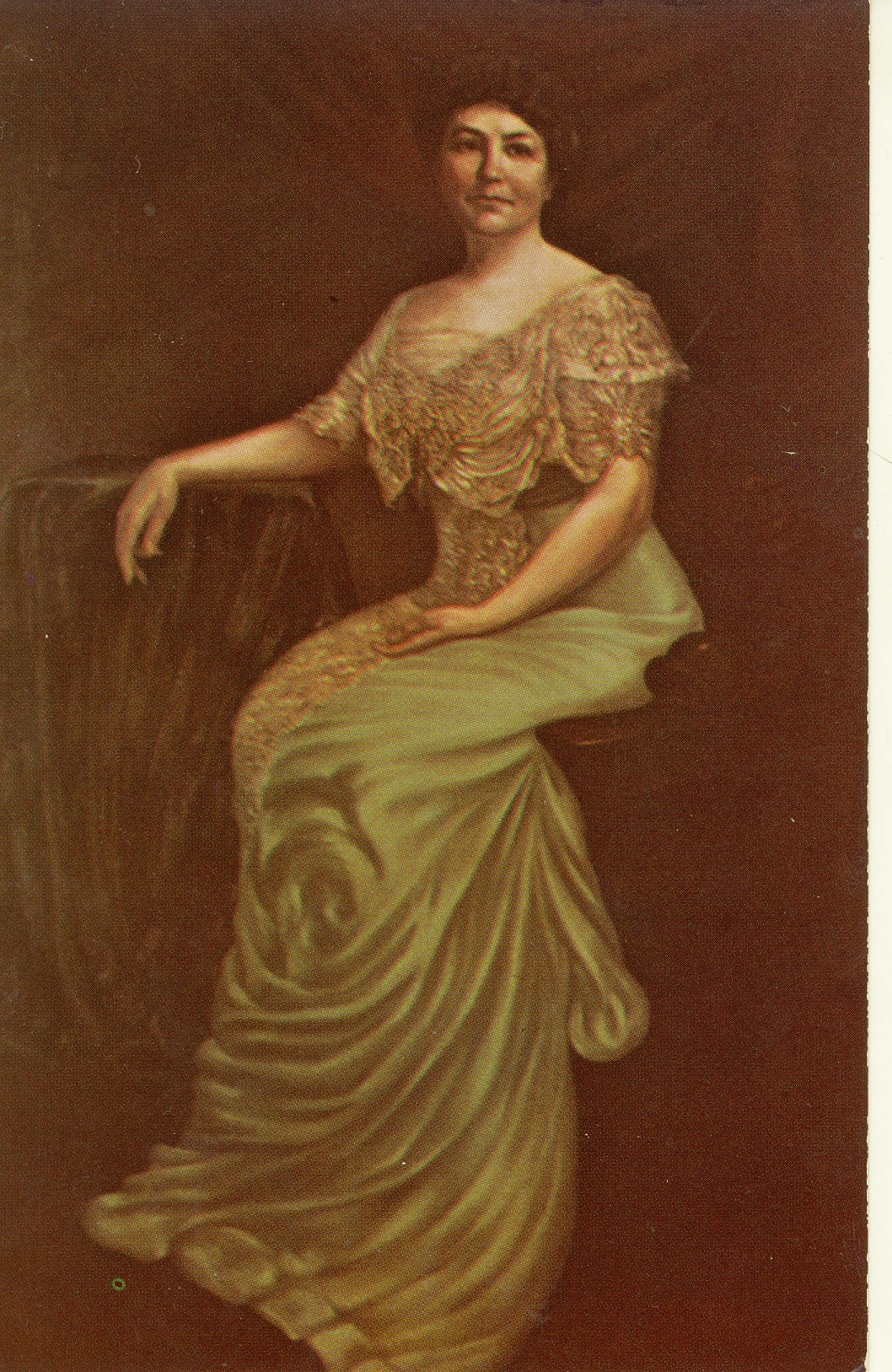
Ellen Axson Wilson 1913-1914

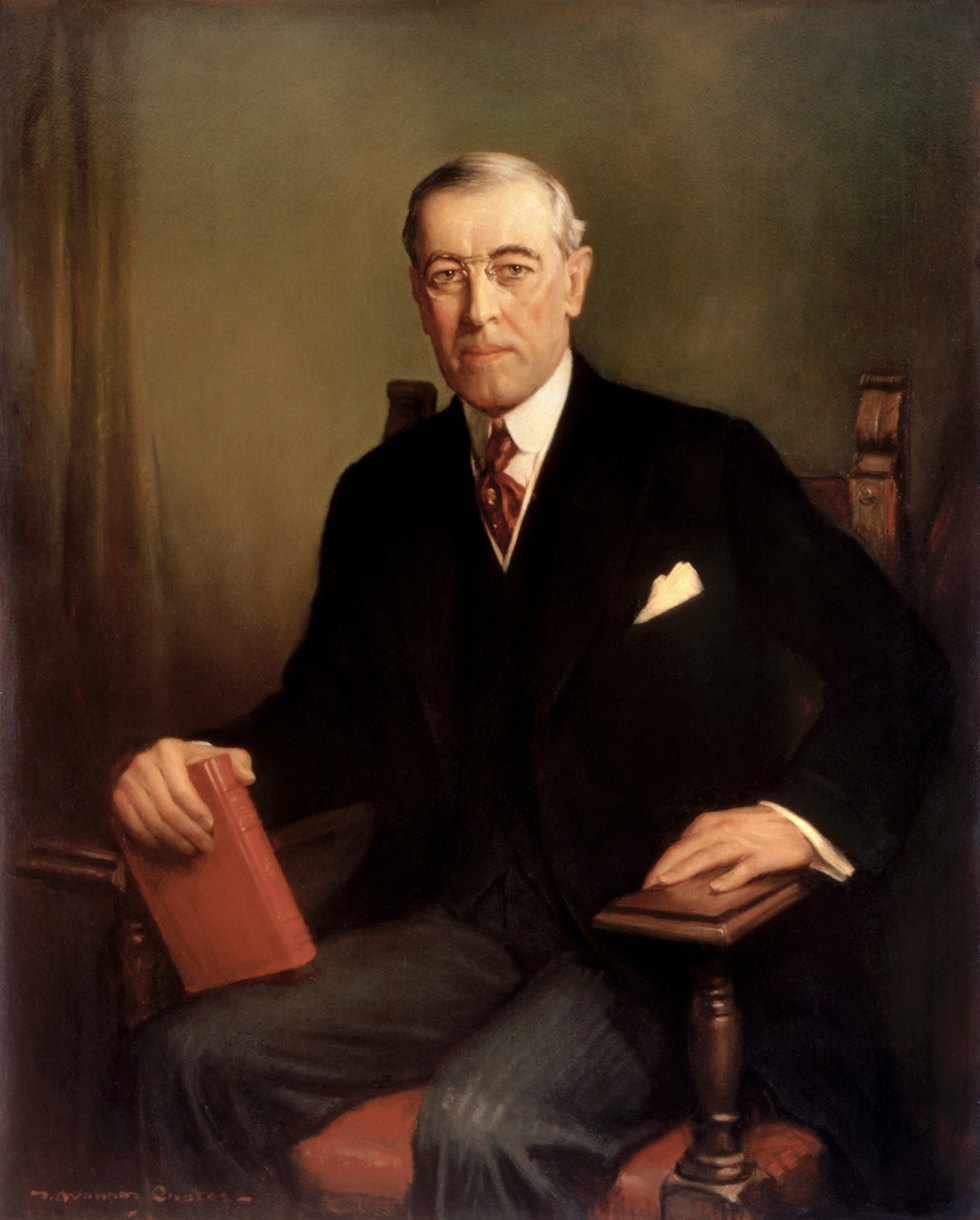
President Wilson official White House portrait 1913

Insisting that her children must not be born as Yankees, Ellen went to stay with relatives in Gainesville, Georgia for Margaret's birth in 1886 and Jessie's in 1887. But Eleanor was born in Connecticut in 1889, while Wilson was teaching at Wesleyan University.

After Edward's death in 1905, Ellen set up a scholarship in his memory at the Berry College; the college held an Ellen Axson Wilson Homecoming event in 2014 to commemorate the centenary of her death.

Wilson's career at Princeton University began in 1890. At that time Ellen worked as researcher and translator for several of her husband's books.

In 1898, Ellen–along with other Princeton women–founded The Present Day Club, a private women's club.

Wilson was elected as president in 1912, bringing Ellen new social responsibilities. She took refuge from such demands in her art. As First Lady, she drew sketches and painted in a studio set up on the third floor of the White House. During her time at the White House, she continued to paint, but exhibited her work under an assumed name. She donated much of her work to charity. She arranged the White House weddings of two of her daughters.

The Wilsons preferred to begin the administration without an inaugural ball. The First Lady's entertainments were simple, but her unaffected cordiality made her parties successful. In their first year, she convinced her scrupulous husband that it would be perfectly proper to invite influential legislators to a private dinner.

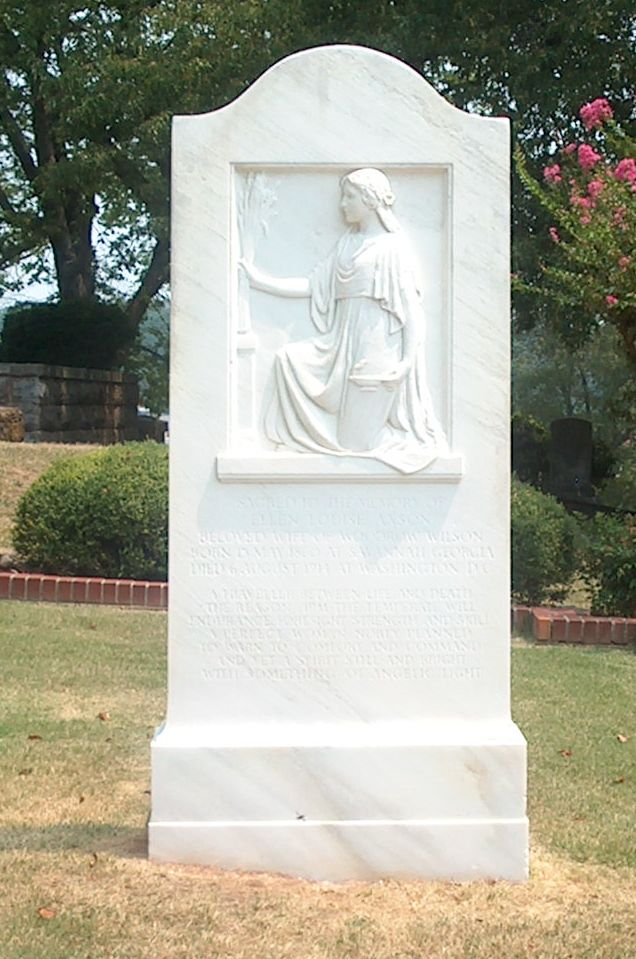
Ellen Louise Wilson's grave in Myrtle Hill Cemetery, Rome, Georgia

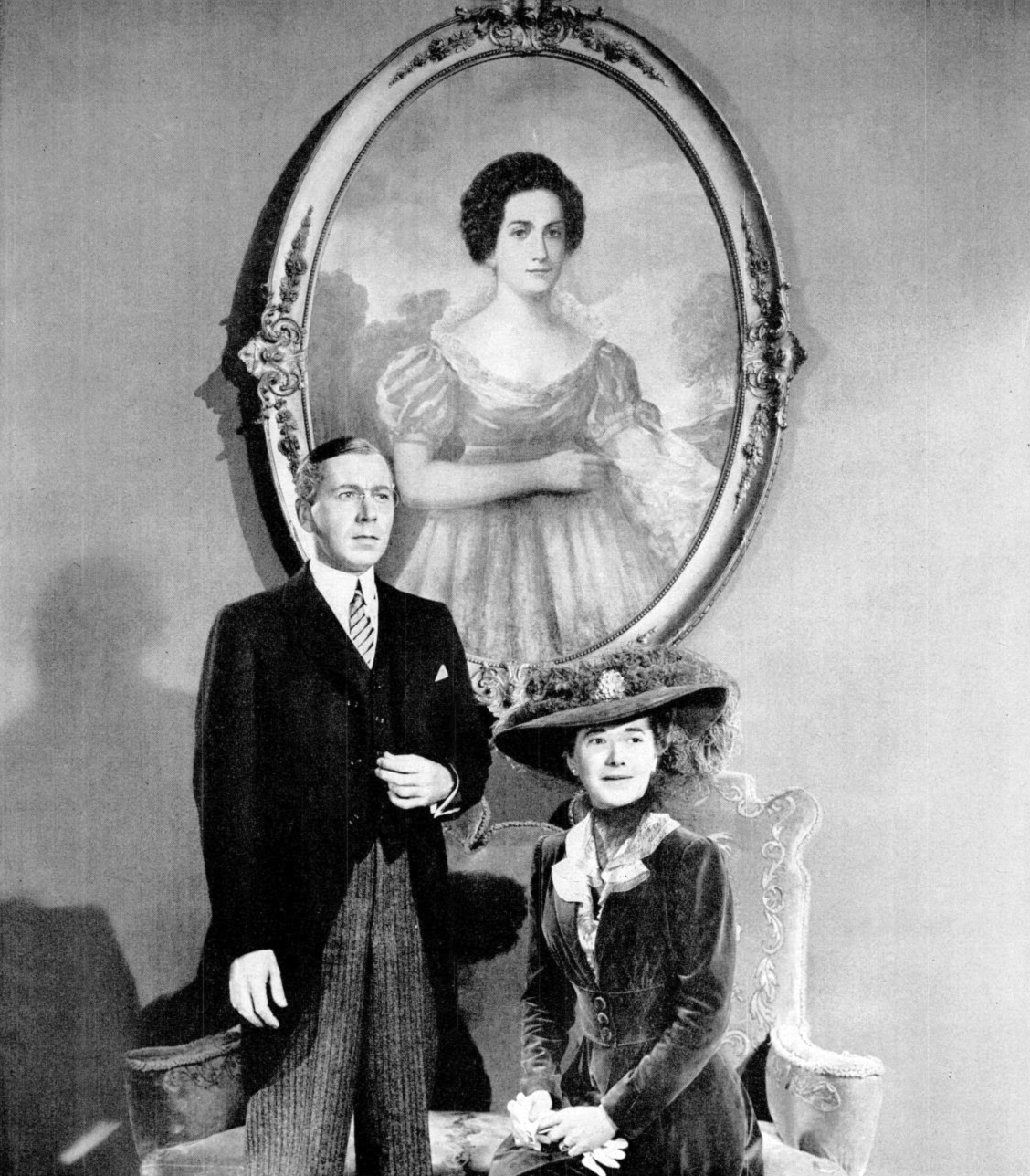
Ruth Nelson portrayed Ellen Axson Wilson in the 1944 film Wilson

Wilson had grown up in a slave-owning family. As First Lady, she devoted much effort to the cause of improving housing in the national capital's largely black slums. She visited dilapidated alleys and brought Congressmen to visit these alleys. The "Alley" bill was legislated by the government on the day of her death.

She died of Bright's disease at the White House on August 6, 1914. She was buried in Rome, Georgia, among her family at Myrtle Hill Cemetery.

In December 1915, President Woodrow Wilson remarried, to Edith Bolling Galt.
