= Robert H. Sayre =

American industrialist (1824–1907)

Robert Heysham Sayre
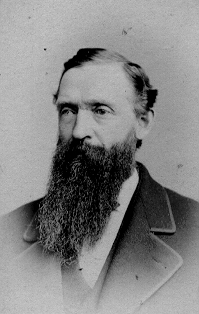
- Born: October 13, 1824; Bloomsburg, Pennsylvania, U.S.
- Died: January 4, 1907 (aged 82); South Bethlehem, Pennsylvania, U.S.
- Occupation(s): Civil engineer, industrialist, and executive
- Spouses: Mary Evelyn Smith; Mary Bradford; Helen Augusta Packer; Martha Finley Nevin
- Children: Charles White Sayre; Mary Eliza Sayre; Anna Catherine Sayre; Robert Heysham Sayre Jr. Elizabeth Kent Sayre; Jennie Weston Sayre; Francis Rodolphus Sayre; Ellen May Sayre; Ruth May Sayre; John Nevin Sayre; Francis Bowes Sayre Sr. Cecil Nevin Sayre
- Parent(s): William Heysham Sayre; Elizabeth Kent

Robert Heysham Sayre (October 13, 1824 – January 4, 1907) was vice president and chief engineer of the Lehigh Valley Railroad. He was also vice president and general manager of Bethlehem Iron Company, the corporate precursor to Bethlehem Steel. The borough of Sayre, Pennsylvania and the small city of Sayre, Oklahoma were named in his honor.

== Early life and education ==
Sayre was born on October 13, 1824, to William Heysham Sayre and his wife, Elizabeth Kent, on the Kent family's farm near Bloomsburg in rural Columbia County, Pennsylvania. In 1828, the Sayre family moved to Mauch Chunk, Pennsylvania, now Jim Thorpe, Pennsylvania, where he worked as a lockmaster for the Lehigh Coal & Navigation Company. He showed an early interest in construction and civil engineering.

== Career ==
Sayre's first significant work in engineering was on the Morris Canal in New Jersey. He also participated in the surveys and construction for the Mauch Chunk Switchback Railway.

In 1854, Sayre was named chief engineer of the Lehigh Valley Railroad, and he led the extension of that railroad northward and westward through Pennsylvania and New York State.

Sayre was one of the founders of Bethlehem Iron Company, the corporate precursor to Bethlehem Steel. He was responsible for the design and construction of the company's first iron works during the years 1861 through 1863. He became vice president of Bethlehem Iron Works in 1891.

Sayre built a large house in Bethlehem, where he lived from 1858 until his death in 1907. The house is now known as the Sayre Mansion, and used as a bed-and-breakfast.

== Philanthropy ==
Sayre was a trustee of St. Luke's Hospital and a charter trustee of Lehigh University in Bethlehem, Pennsylvania.

In 1868, Sayre donated $5,000 for the development of Sayre Observatory at Lehigh University.
