= Joseph Ruggles Wilson =

American theologian and father of Woodrow Wilson (1822–1903)

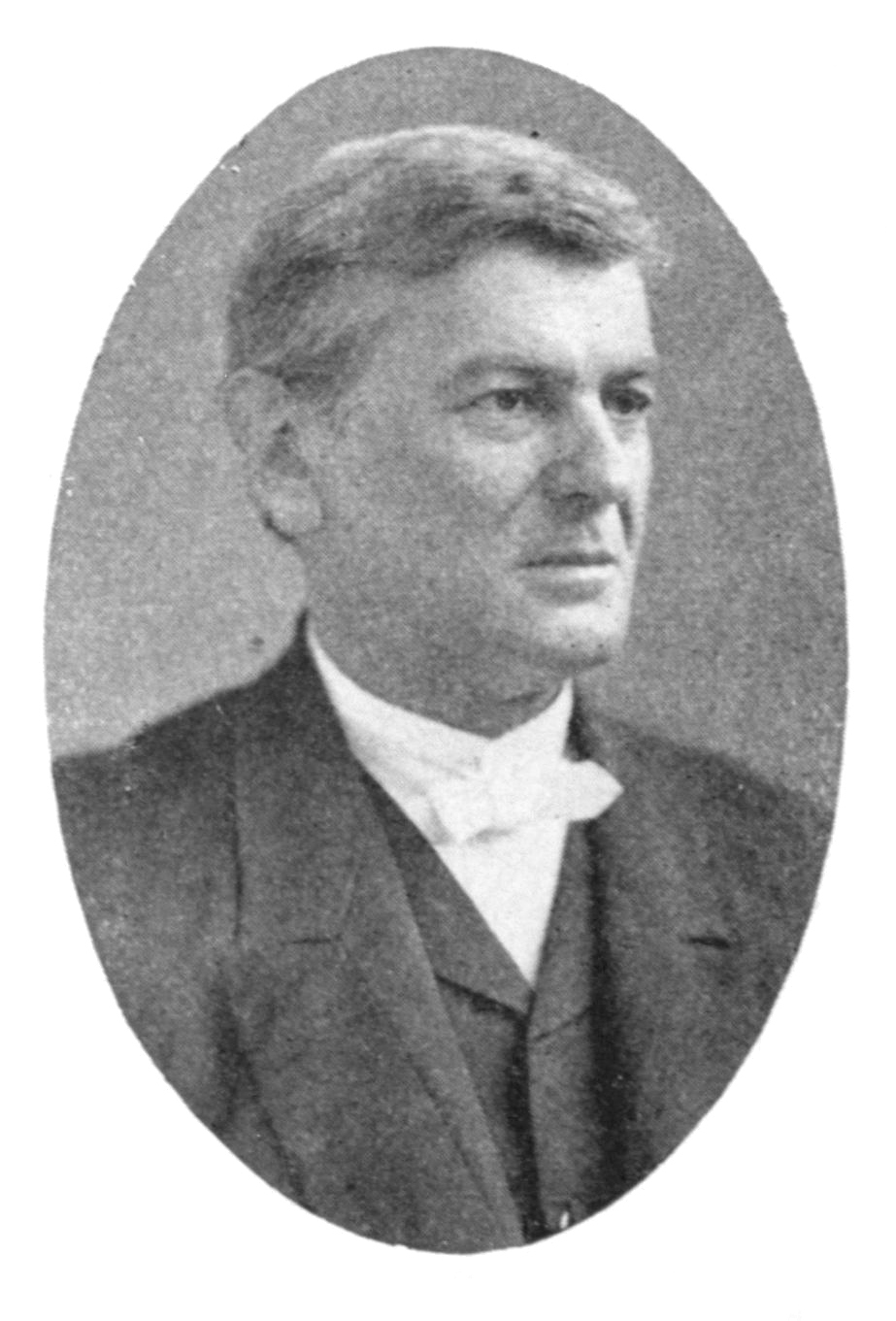
- Born: February 28, 1822; Steubenville, Ohio, U.S.
- Died: January 21, 1903 (aged 80); Princeton, New Jersey, U.S.
- Education: Jefferson College; Princeton Theological Seminary
- Spouse: Jessie Janet Woodrow
- Children: Woodrow; Joseph Jr.; Annie; Marion
- Parent: James Wilson

Ecclesiastical career
- Religion: Presbyterian
- Church: Presbyterian Church in the United States

Joseph Ruggles Wilson Sr. (February 28, 1822 – January 21, 1903) was a prominent American Presbyterian theologian and father of President Woodrow Wilson, Nashville Banner editor Joseph Ruggles Wilson Jr., and Anne E. Wilson Howe. In 1861, as pastor of First Presbyterian Church in Augusta, Georgia, he organized the General Assembly of the newly formed Presbyterian Church in the United States, known as the Southern Presbyterian Church, and served as its clerk (chief executive officer) for 37 years.

== Life and work ==
Wilson was born on February 28, 1822 in Steubenville, Ohio, the son of Mary Anne (Adams) and James Wilson, who were Protestant immigrants from Strabane, County Tyrone, Ireland (today in Northern Ireland). He graduated from Jefferson College (now Washington & Jefferson College) in Canonsburg, Pennsylvania in 1844. He taught literature at Washington & Jefferson.

Wilson married Jessie Woodrow and was later employed as a professor at Hampden–Sydney College. He left the school in 1856, just before the birth of his son, Thomas Woodrow Wilson, in Staunton, Virginia, which occurred on December 28. There he became the pastor of Staunton's Presbyterian Church, which he held from 1855 to 1857. In late 1857 he moved his family to Augusta, Georgia, where he continued to practice as a Presbyterian pastor.

Joseph and Jessie Wilson had moved to the South in 1851 and came to fully identify with it, moving from Virginia deeper into the region as Wilson was called to be a minister in Georgia and South Carolina. Joseph Wilson owned slaves, defended slavery, and also set up a Sunday school for his slaves. Wilson and his wife identified with the Confederacy during the American Civil War; they cared for wounded soldiers at their church, and Wilson briefly served as a chaplain to the Confederate States Army.

In 1861 Wilson was one of the founders of the Southern Presbyterian Church in the United States (PCUS) after it split from the northern Presbyterians. He served as the first permanent clerk of the PCUS General Assembly, was Stated Clerk for more than three decades from 1865 to 1898, and was Moderator of the PCUS General Assembly in 1879. He served as minister of the First Presbyterian Church in Augusta, Georgia until 1870.

Wilson became a professor at Columbia Theological Seminary in Columbia, South Carolina, in 1870. He moved to the pastorate at the First Presbyterian Church, Wilmington, North Carolina, in 1874. During his time in Wilmington, he presided over many events, including the payment of the local church's debts, the abolition of pew rents, and the inauguration of subscription and weekly contributions. In 1885 he became a professor of theology at Rhodes College, which was then known as Southwestern Presbyterian University, in Clarksville, Tennessee.

He died in Princeton, New Jersey, on January 21, 1903 at the age of eighty.

== Children ==
- Thomas Woodrow Wilson (December 28, 1856 – February 3, 1924), professor and President of Princeton University (1902–1910), Governor of New Jersey (1911–1913), President of the United States (1913–1921)
- Joseph Ruggles Wilson Jr. (1867–1927), editor of the Nashville Banner
- Annie Josephine Wilson Howe (1854–1916)
