= Eleanor Wilson McAdoo =

Youngest daughter of President Woodrow Wilson

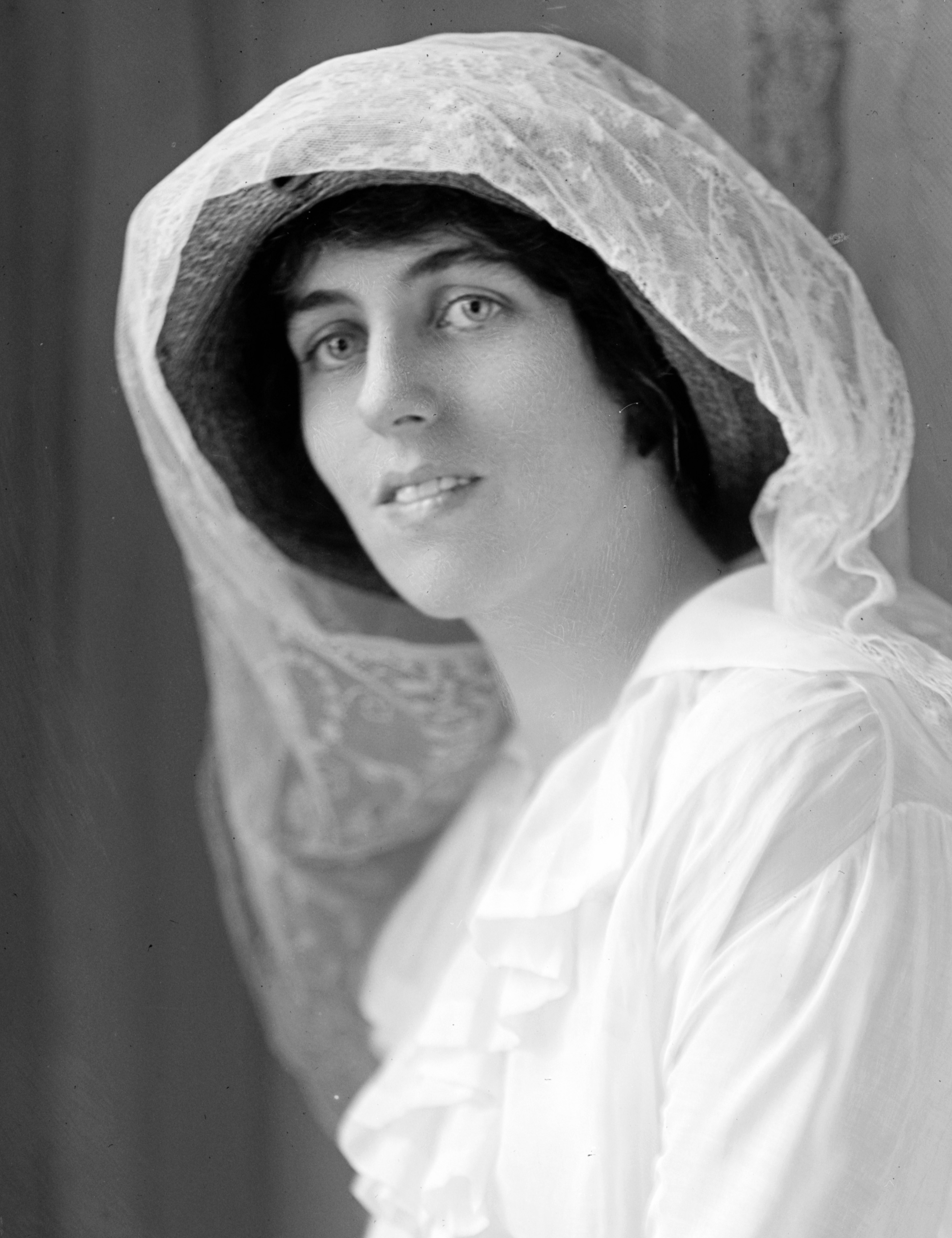
- Eleanor Wilson c. 1910
- Born: Eleanor Randolph Wilson; October 16, 1889; Middletown, Connecticut, U.S.
- Died: April 5, 1967 (aged 77); Montecito, California, U.S.
- Resting place: Santa Barbara, California
- Other name: Nellie Wilson
- Education: Saint Mary's School
- Spouse: William Gibbs McAdoo (m. 1914; div. 1935)
- Children: 2
- Parents: Woodrow Wilson; Ellen Axson Wilson
- Relatives: Jessie Wilson Sayre (Sister); Margaret Woodrow Wilson (sister); Francis Bowes Sayre Jr. (nephew); Eleanor Sayre (Niece); Edith Wilson (stepmother)

Eleanor Randolph Wilson McAdoo (October 16, 1889 – April 5, 1967) was an American writer and the youngest daughter of American president Woodrow Wilson and Ellen Louise Axson. Wilson had two sisters, Margaret Woodrow Wilson and Jessie Wilson Sayre.

== Biography ==
She was born on October 16, 1889, to Woodrow Wilson and Ellen Axson Wilson in Middletown, Connecticut. She was educated at Saint Mary's School, an Episcopal boarding school for girls in Raleigh, North Carolina.

She married William Gibbs McAdoo, Wilson's Secretary of the Treasury, at the White House on May 7, 1914. They had two daughters: Ellen Wilson McAdoo (1915–1946) and Mary Faith McAdoo (1920–1988). She divorced McAdoo in July 1935.

Because she had written a biography about her father, she served as an informal counselor on the 1944 biopic Wilson.

McAdoo died at her home in Montecito, California, at 77. She was interred at the Santa Barbara Cemetery, Santa Barbara, California. She was the last surviving child of Woodrow Wilson.

== Family ==
- Woodrow Wilson, father
- Ellen Axson Wilson, mother
- Edith Bolling, stepmother
- William Gibbs McAdoo, former husband
- Margaret Wilson, sister
- Jessie Woodrow Wilson Sayre, sister

== Publications ==
- The Woodrow Wilsons by Eleanor Wilson McAdoo (McMillan, 1937)
- Julia and the White House "An American girl finds herself in the exciting yet sobering limelight of the White House" (Dodd, Mead, 1946)
