= Francis Bowes Sayre Sr. =

American judge

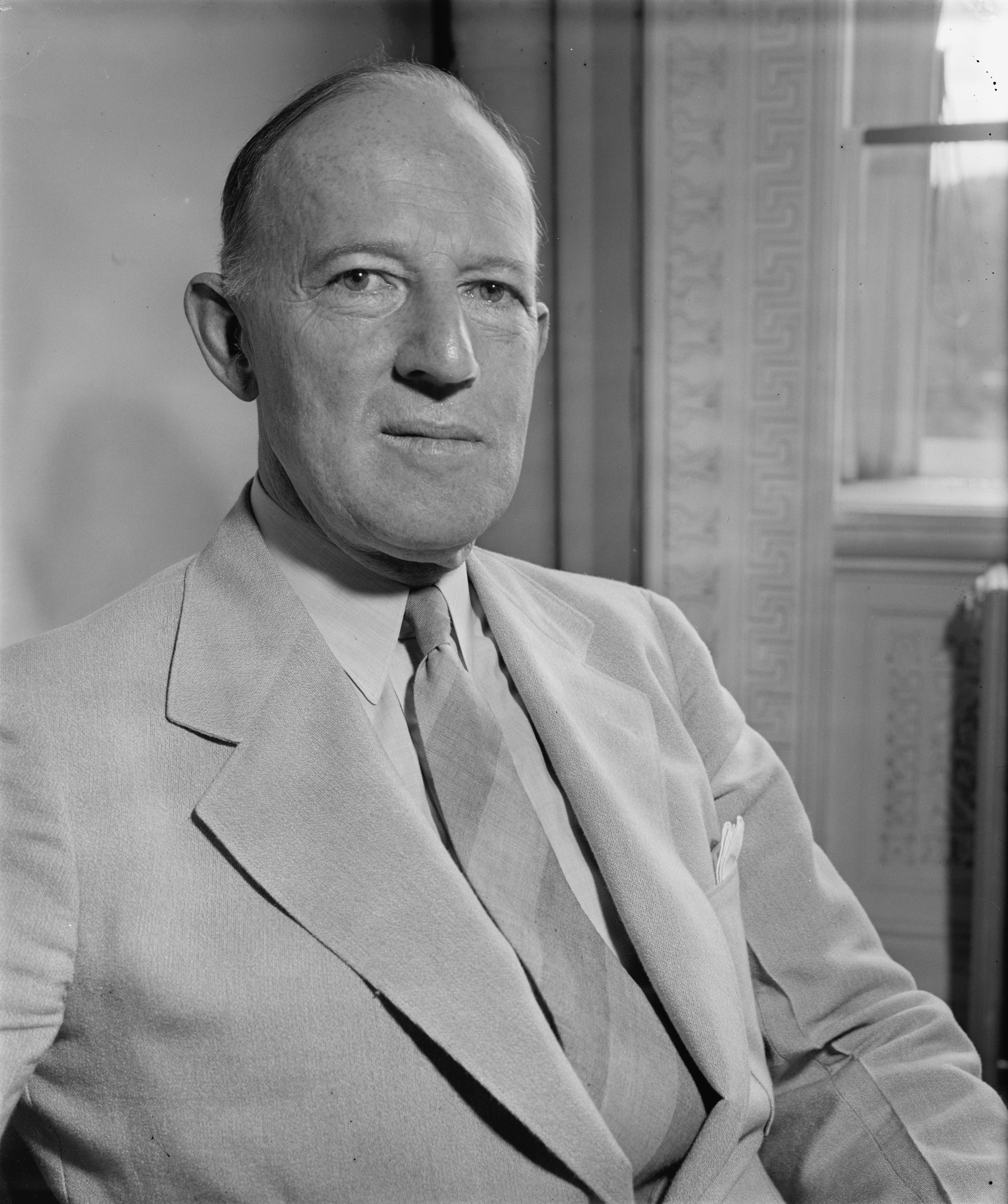
- Sayre in 1939

3rd High Commissioner to the Philippines
- In office October 28, 1939 – October 12, 1942
- President: Franklin Roosevelt
- Preceded by: Weldon Jones (Acting)
- Succeeded by: Harold L. Ickes

Personal details
- Born: April 30, 1885 Bethlehem, Pennsylvania, U.S.
- Died: March 29, 1972 (aged 86) Washington, D.C., U.S.
- Resting place: Washington National Cathedral
- Spouses: Jessie Woodrow Wilson (m. 1913; died 1933) Elizabeth Evans Graves (m. 1937)
- Children: 3
- Education: Williams College; Harvard Law School
- Occupation: Lawyer, diplomat, educator

Francis Bowes Sayre Sr. (April 30, 1885 – March 29, 1972) was a professor at Harvard Law School, High Commissioner of the Philippines, and a son-in-law of President Woodrow Wilson.

== Biography ==
He was born on April 30, 1885. He graduated from Williams College in 1909 and Harvard Law School in 1912. At the start of his career, Sayre worked for Wilfred Grenfell's medical mission in Newfoundland, and as an assistant prosecutor in the office of the New York County District Attorney.

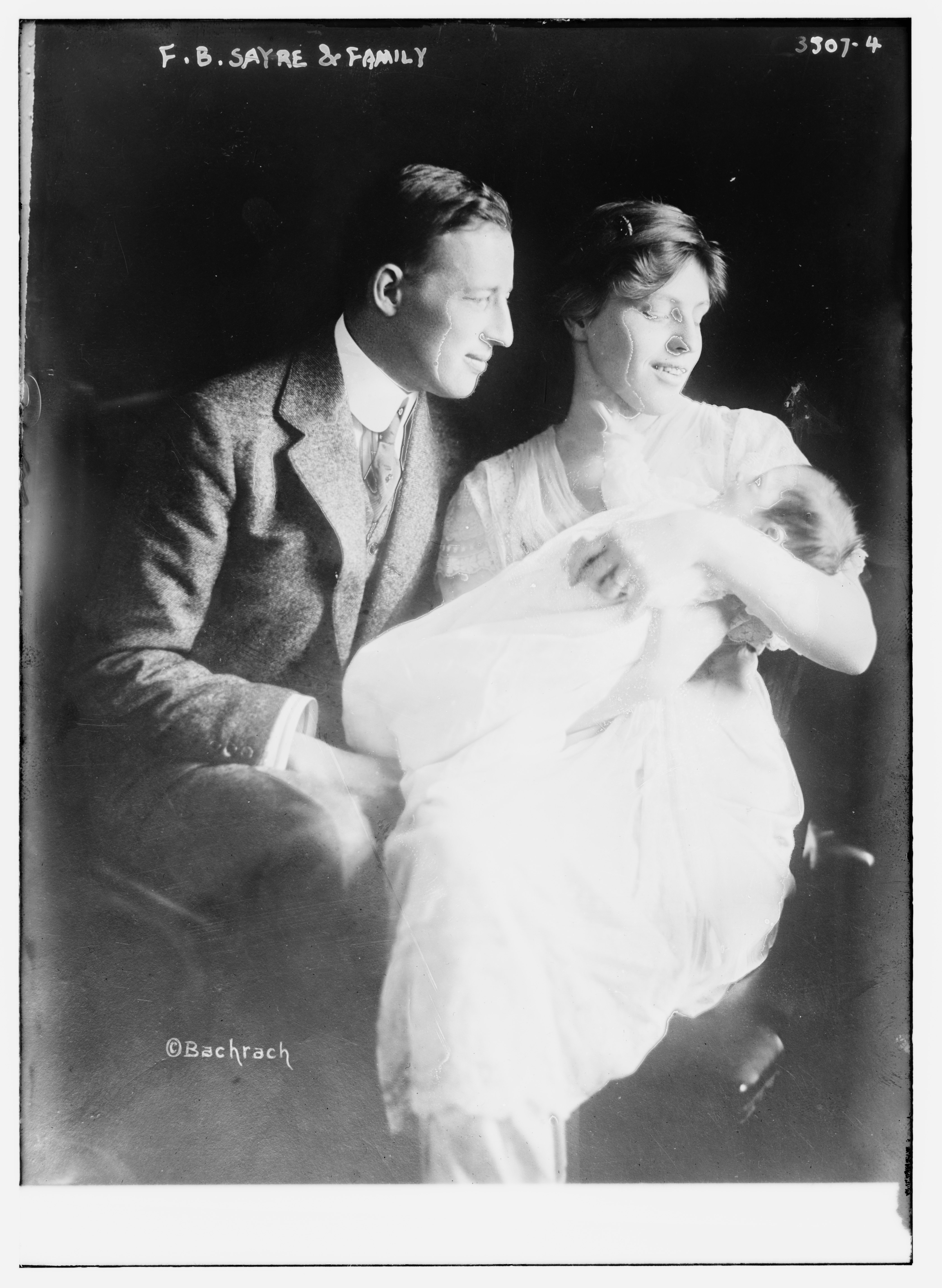
Sayre and Jessie Wilson Sayre with their son, 1915

On November 25, 1913, Sayre married Jessie Woodrow Wilson (1887–1933), the middle daughter of President Woodrow Wilson, in a ceremony at the White House. In 1914 he began work as an assistant to the president of Williams College. He served on the faculty at Harvard Law School from 1917 to 1933, and he received his S.J.D. degree from Harvard in 1918.

He later served as foreign affairs advisor to the government of King Vajiravudh of Siam as successor to American Foreign Affairs Adviser Edward Henry Strobel, Jens Westengard and Eldon James; Assistant Secretary of State, High Commissioner of the Philippines, and U.S. representative to the United Nations Trusteeship Council. While Sayre was Siam's foreign affairs advisor, he was appointed by King Prajadhipok as Siam's representative on the Permanent Court of Arbitration at The Hague. He was awarded the Grand Cross of the Crown of Siam, and was the second American advisor to be awarded the title Phya Kalyanamaitri or "the beautiful in friendship." The first American Adviser in Foreign Affairs, also a Harvard law professor, was Edward Henry Strobel.

Sayre served as High Commissioner to the Philippines from October 28, 1939 to October 12, 1942. He visited Japan in May 1940 and held several meetings with Foreign Minister Hachirō Arita. He proposed the Pacific Nonaggression Pact and the withdrawal of Japanese troops from China to Arita, but was rejected. He was evacuated from the Philippines along with General Douglas MacArthur, President Manuel Quezon and other officials of the Commonwealth government after the Japanese invasion of the Philippines in December 1941.

Sayre's immediate subordinate in his later capacity of Assistant Secretary of State was Alger Hiss.

He died on March 29, 1972, and was buried at Washington National Cathedral.

== Legacy ==
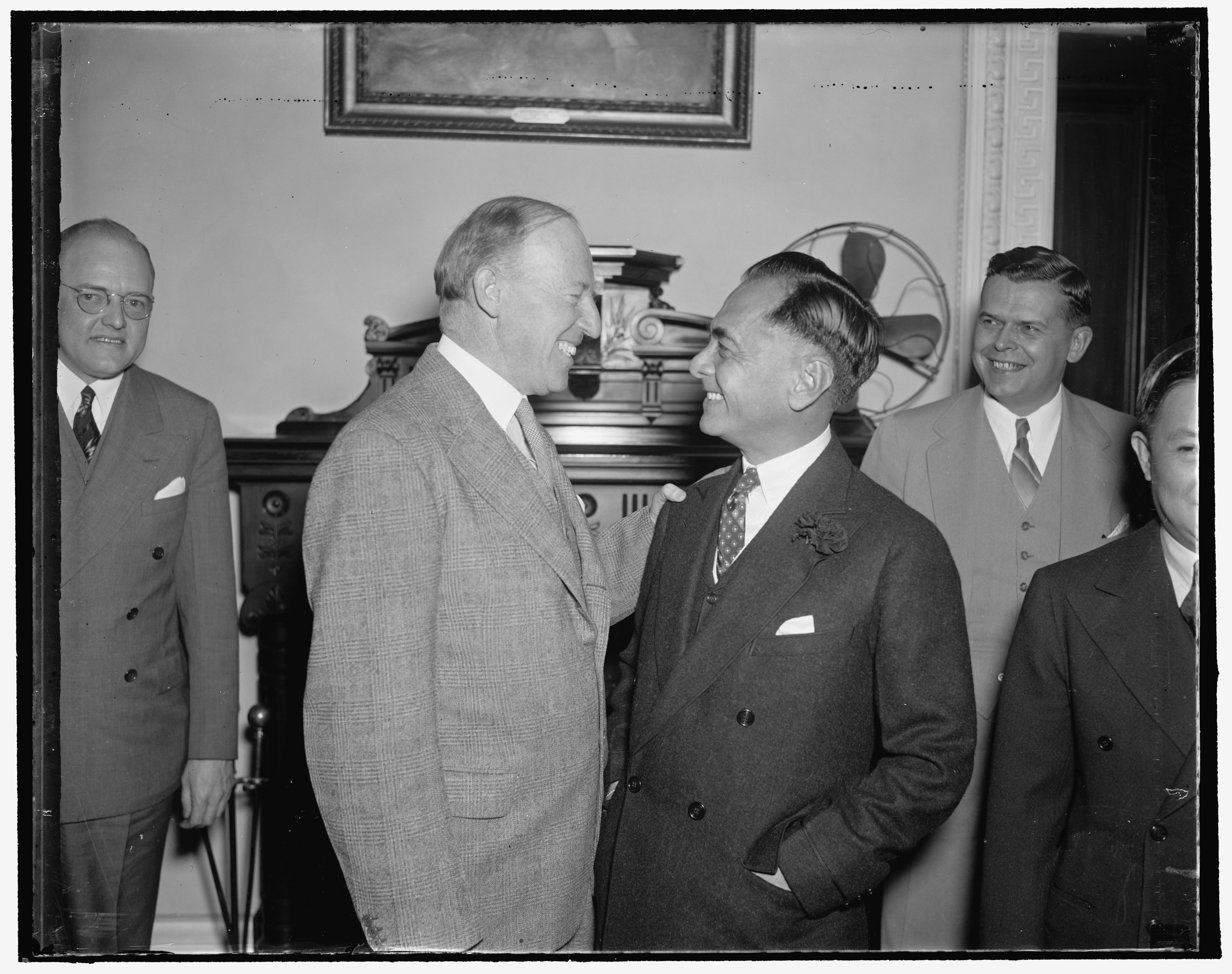
Study plan for early independence of Philippines. Washington, D.C., April 19, 1937, showing Assistant Secretary of State Francis B. Sayre, (2nd from left) and Philippine President Manuel L. Quezon (3rd from left)

Sayre's son, Francis Bowes Sayre Jr., (1915–2008) was the dean of the National Cathedral in Washington from 1951 until his retirement in 1978. His daughter Eleanor (1916–2001) was an expert on the Spanish painter Goya and served from 1945 to 1984 as a curator at the Boston Museum of Fine Arts.

The Sayre Highway stretching from Cagayan de Oro to Kabacan, Cotabato, in the Philippines was named after him, formerly named Route 3, since he was the one who spearheaded its construction.

Kanlayana Maitri Road, a short street near the Royal Grand Palace in the area of Rattanakosin Island or Bangkok's old town zone. It changed its name from "Bamrung Mueang Road" in his honor in 1973.

Preceded by Paul V. McNutt	High Commissioner of the Philippines; 1939-1942	Succeeded by Paul V. McNutt
