= Margaret Woodrow Wilson =

First Lady of the United States from 1914 to 1915

Margaret Wilson
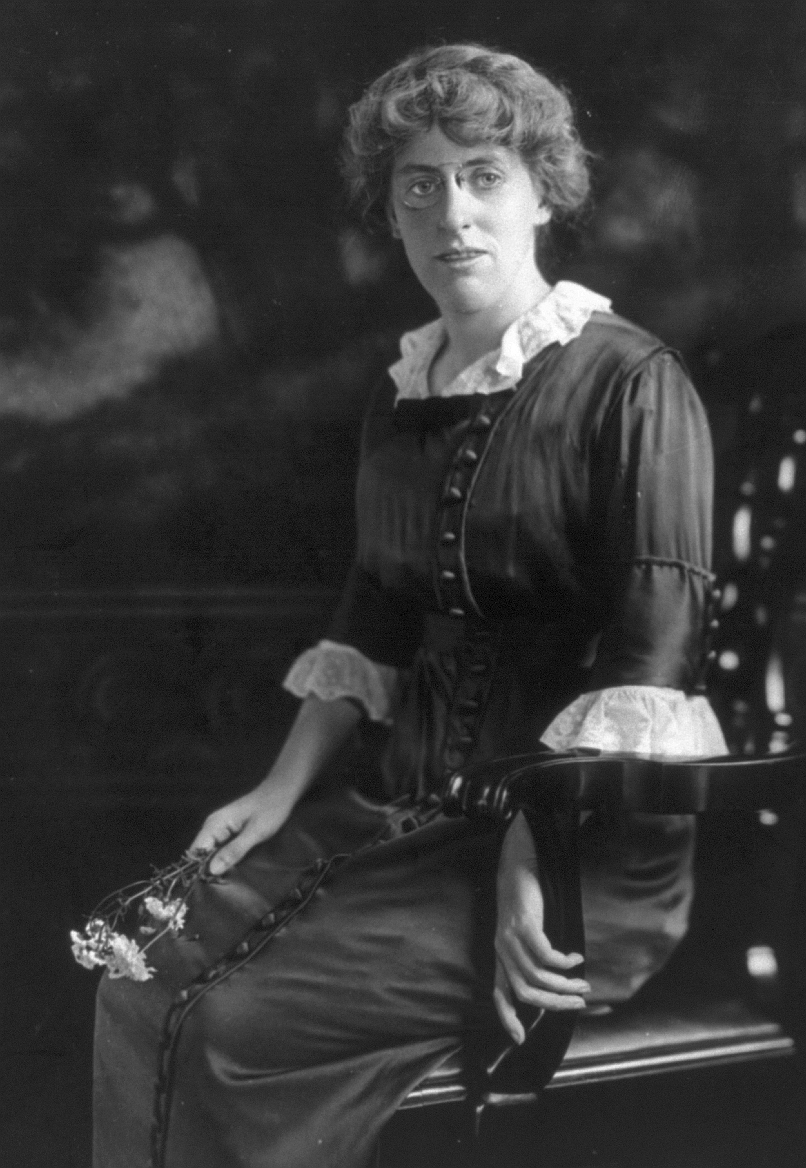
- Margaret Wilson in 1912

First Lady of the United States
- In role August 6, 1914 – December 18, 1915
- President: Woodrow Wilson
- Preceded by: Ellen Wilson
- Succeeded by: Edith Wilson

Personal details
- Born: Margaret Woodrow Wilson; April 16, 1886 Gainesville, Georgia, U.S.
- Died: February 12, 1944 (aged 57) Pondicherry, French India
- Parents: Woodrow Wilson; Ellen Axson Wilson

Margaret Woodrow Wilson (April 16, 1886 – February 12, 1944) was the eldest daughter of U.S. President Woodrow Wilson and Ellen Louise Axson. She is best known for serving as First Lady of the United States from August 1914 to December 1915, during the period between her mother's death and her father's remarriage to Edith Bolling Galt.

Born in Gainesville, Georgia, Wilson spent her early years in academic environments due to her father's career as a professor, later attending Goucher College and training in voice and piano at the Peabody Institute. She developed a strong interest in music, social service, and education, and became an accomplished soprano singer, making several recordings and performing for Allied troops during World War I.

Wilson was also an advocate for women's suffrage and, despite her father's policies supporting segregation, she worked to improve conditions for African American students in Washington, D.C. Later in her life, she became deeply interested in spirituality. In 1938, she moved to the Sri Aurobindo Ashram in Pondicherry, India, where she was given the name Nishtha (Sanskrit: निष्ठा, lit. 'devotion'). She remained at the ashram until her death in 1944.

== Biography ==
Margaret Woodrow Wilson was born in Gainesville, Georgia, on April 16, 1886. At the time of her birth, Wilson's parents were living near Philadelphia, Pennsylvania; her father was on the faculty of Bryn Mawr College. She had two siblings: Jessie, and Eleanor. Both of her parents strongly identified with the South. Consequently, Ellen Wilson did not want her children born as Yankees and arranged to stay with family in Gainesville for Margaret's birth. Margaret attended local schools, some of which were associated with the colleges where her father taught. She was a member of Gamma Phi Beta Sorority at Goucher College, alongside her sister Jessie.

In his will, Woodrow Wilson had bequeathed his daughter an annuity of $2,500 annually (worth $46,966 today) as long as that amount did not exceed one-third of the annual income of his estate, and as long as she remained unmarried. Wilson sang, and she made several recordings. In 1914, "My Laddie" was released on Columbia Records, #39195.

In 1938, Wilson traveled to the ashram of Sri Aurobindo in Pondicherry, India, where she remained for the rest of her life. She became a member and devotee of the ashram and was given the new name Nistha, meaning "dedication" in Sanskrit. She and the scholar Joseph Campbell edited the English translation of the classical work on the Hindu mystic, Sri Ramakrishna, The Gospel of Sri Ramakrishna by Swami Nikhilananda, which was published in 1942, by Ramakrishna-Vivekananda Center, New York.

The Star-Spangled Banner (1915)
A 1915 recording of the Star-Spangled Banner as sung by Margaret Woodrow Wilson, daughter of Woodrow Wilson

Wilson died from uremia on February 12, 1944, at the age of 57, and was buried in Pondicherry, India, unmarried, and without issue.

== See also ==
- The Subtle Body, a 2010 history of yoga in America with a chapter on Wilson
- Bibliography of United States presidential spouses and first ladies

Honorary titles
Preceded by Ellen Wilson	First Lady of the United States; Acting; 1914–1915	Succeeded by Edith Wilson
