= List of memoirs by first ladies of the United States =

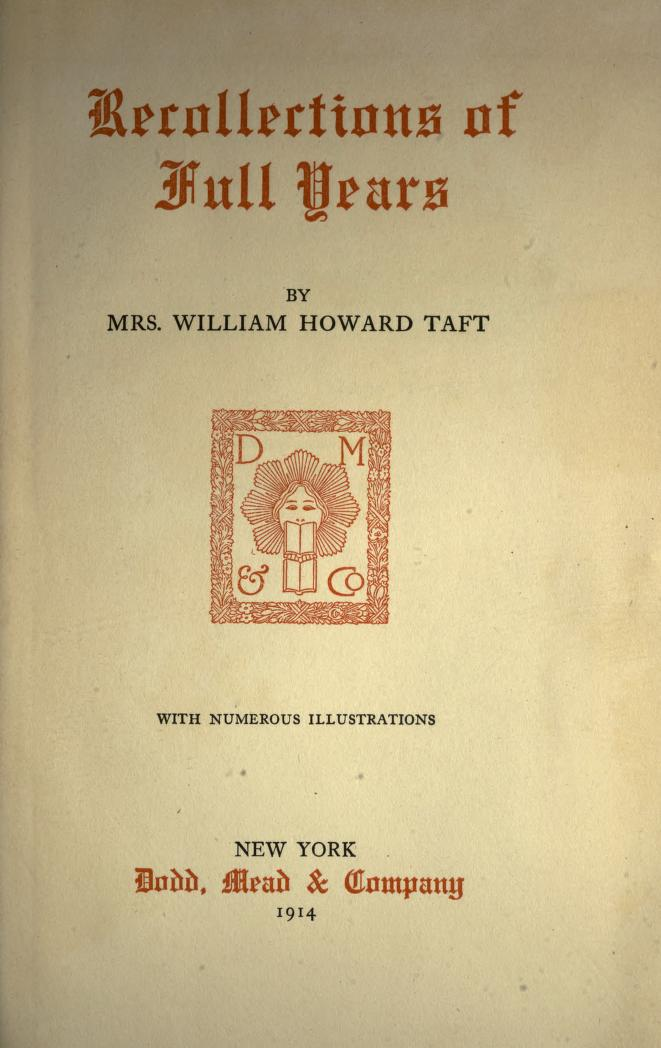
Title page of Recollections of Full Years by Helen Taft

Fourteen first ladies of the United States have written a total of twenty-four memoirs. The first lady is the hostess of the White House, and the position is traditionally filled by the wife of the president of the United States, with some historical exceptions. Every memoir by a first lady published in the 20th and 21st centuries has been a bestseller, at times outselling those of their presidential husbands.

In the early 1800s, Abigail Adams had her correspondence published as Letters of Mrs. Adams, the Wife of John Adams, and Louisa Adams "made several attempts at an autobiography", though she never sought to publish them. The Memoirs and Letters of Dolley Madison, Wife of James Madison, President of the United States were published in 1886 but were actually edited by Lucia Cutts and written by Dolley Madison's niece Mary Cutts. (Note: According to Stuart Leibiger, "Many historians (including myself) have cited the Memoirs and Letters of Dolly Madison: Wife of James Madison, President of the United States [...] without realizing that the volume was actually written by Dolley's niece, Mary Estelle Elizabeth Cutts, and published without attribution.")

Julia Grant was the first to write and attempt to publish her memoirs, writing The Personal Memoirs of Julia Dent Grant in the 1890s after the death of her husband Ulysses S. Grant. However, she never found a suitable publisher for them before her death in 1902, in part because she had unrealistic expectations of their value. The memoirs were eventually published in 1975. Helen Taft was the first to have memoirs published during her lifetime, in 1914. Memoirs by presidential spouses were uncommon until the 1970s; in the decades after Taft, only Edith Wilson, Grace Coolidge, Eleanor Roosevelt, and Lady Bird Johnson wrote and published their memoirs. Coolidge had her memoirs published in the 1930s as several articles in The American Magazine. Most first ladies have written and published at least one memoir about their life since Betty Ford's publication of her first memoir in the late 1970s.

Early published memoirs focused on relatively trivial matters, often largely focusing on the first lady's personal life. Helen Taft's memoirs were described by The New York Sun as "bright, witty, delightfully entertaining reminiscences" upon publication, and Edith Wilson's My Memoir was criticized by contemporary reviewers such as The New York Times for excessively focusing on clothing and social events. Eleanor Roosevelt, who wrote four autobiographies, marked a shift in the content of the memoirs, writing more about political issues and less on her personal life. Lady Bird Johnson condensed a dictated two-million-word transcript into 300,000 for A White House Diary, which outsold her husband Lyndon B. Johnson's memoir. In the 1960s Jacqueline Kennedy Onassis was involved in editing two books by Molly Thayer, Jacqueline Kennedy and Jacqueline Kennedy: The White House Years.

Memoirs written by Betty Ford, Rosalynn Carter and Barbara Bush also outsold the memoirs of their husbands. My Turn by Nancy Reagan, published in 1989, was nicknamed My Burn for its "vengeful" coverage of Reagan's life, particularly in the White House. The book sold very well, remaining on The New York Times Best Seller list for more than three months. Michelle Obama's memoir Becoming was published in 2018. She received over $60 million in advance of publication, and the book had sold over 11.5 million copies as of November 2019. Melania Trump published her memoir Melania in 2024, which debuted at number one on The New York Times Best Seller list in the nonfiction genre.

== Memoirs ==
Title	First lady	Publisher	Year	Identifier	Note
Personal Memoirs of Julia Dent Grant	Julia Grant	Putnam Publishing Group	1975	ISBN 978-0-399-11386-4; OCLC 1362819	(Note: Grant tried but was unable to secure a publisher for her memoirs during her lifetime.)
Recollections of Full Years	Helen Taft	Dodd, Mead & Company	1914	OCLC 1071952821	
My Memoir	Edith Wilson	Bobbs-Merrill Company	1939	OCLC 300015696	
This is My Story	Eleanor Roosevelt	Harper & Brothers	1937	OCLC 1222392544	
This I Remember	Eleanor Roosevelt	Harper & Brothers	1949	OCLC 1222358304	
On My Own	Eleanor Roosevelt	Harper & Brothers	1958	OCLC 1007583041	
The Autobiography of Eleanor Roosevelt	Eleanor Roosevelt	Harper & Brothers	1961	OCLC 241967	(Note: Compiled material from her first three autobiographies with additional chapters)
A White House Diary	Lady Bird Johnson	Holt, Rinehart & Winston	1970	ISBN 978-0-03-085254-1; OCLC 247688211	
The Times of My Life	Betty Ford	Harper & Row	1978	ISBN 978-0-06-011298-1; OCLC 1089520085	(Note: Written with Chris Chase)
Betty: A Glad Awakening	Betty Ford	Doubleday	1987	ISBN 978-0-385-23502-0; OCLC 624464837	
First Lady from Plains	Rosalynn Carter	Houghton Mifflin	1984	ISBN 978-0-395-35294-6; OCLC 608350043	
Everything to Gain: Making the Most of the Rest of Your Life	Rosalynn Carter	Random House	1987	ISBN 978-0-394-55858-5; OCLC 1020180943	(Note: Written with husband Jimmy Carter)
Nancy: The Autobiography of America's First Lady	Nancy Reagan	HarperCollins	1980	ISBN 978-0-688-03533-4; OCLC 5613799	(Note: Written with Bill Libby)
My Turn	Nancy Reagan	Random House	1989	ISBN 978-0-394-56368-8; OCLC 19921006	(Note: Written with William Novak)
Barbara Bush: A Memoir	Barbara Bush	Scribner	1994	ISBN 978-0-02-519635-3; OCLC 733651482	
Reflections: Life After the White House	Barbara Bush	Scribner	2004	ISBN 978-0-7432-5582-0; OCLC 57355785	
Living History	Hillary Clinton	Simon & Schuster	2003	ISBN 978-0-7432-2224-2; OCLC 961885123	
Hard Choices	Hillary Clinton	Simon & Schuster	2014	ISBN 978-1-4767-5144-3; OCLC 900303720	
What Happened	Hillary Clinton	Simon & Schuster	2017	ISBN 978-1-5011-7556-5; OCLC 1003606642	
Spoken from the Heart	Laura Bush	Scribner	2010	ISBN 978-1-4391-5520-2; OCLC 669262090	
Becoming	Michelle Obama	Crown Publishing Group	2018	ISBN 978-1-5247-6313-8; OCLC 1079014347	
Where the Light Enters: Building a Family, Discovering Myself	Jill Biden	Flatiron Books	2019	ISBN 978-1-250-18234-0; OCLC 1198401967	(Note: Published before becoming the first lady)
Melania	Melania Trump	Skyhorse Publishing	2024	ISBN 978-1-5107-8269-3; OCLC 1456034308	
View from the East Wing	Jill Biden	Gallery Books	2026	ISBN 978-1-6682-2288-1	

== See also ==
- List of American political memoirs
- List of autobiographies by presidents of the United States
