= First Ladies: Influence & Image =

American television series

- Presented by: Susan Swain
- Country of origin: United States
- Original language: English
- No. of seasons: 2
- No. of episodes: 35

Production
- Executive producer: Mark Farkas
- Running time: Approximately 90 minutes

Original release
- Network: C-SPAN
- Release: February 25, 2013 – February 10, 2014

First Ladies: Influence & Image is a 35-episode American television series produced by C-SPAN that originally aired from February 25, 2013 to February 10, 2014. Each episode originally aired live and looked at the life and times of one or more of the first ladies of the United States. Episodes featured interviews with historians, journalists, and other experts; included footage of locations significant to the featured first lady and interviews with several contemporary first ladies; and incorporated calls and tweets from viewers. C-SPAN has archived all video from the series to its website. It was produced in cooperation with the White House Historical Association, and was hosted by C-SPAN co-CEO Susan Swain.

In April 2015, PublicAffairs Books published the companion book First Ladies: Presidential Historians on the Lives of 45 Iconic American Women by Swain and C-SPAN. The network began re-airing the TV series on C-SPAN3 in April 2015.

== Background and production ==
The series was executive produced by Mark Farkas, who also produced C-SPAN's series on presidents, unsuccessful candidates and the Abraham Lincoln-Stephen Douglas debates of 1858, and feature documentaries on the Capitol, White House and Supreme Court. The idea for the series came from Richard Norton Smith, a presidential historian and former head of five presidential libraries. Norton Smith and historians William Seale, Rosalyn Terborg-Penn and Edith Mayo served as the show's academic advisors. Producer Andy Och, a video journalist, visited historic sites significant to the first ladies. Farkas and Och spoke with historians, archivists and curators. The show was hosted by C-SPAN co-CEO Susan Swain. Peter Slen hosted the program on Eleanor Roosevelt and co-hosted programs on Mamie Eisenhower, and Edith Wilson.

With First Ladies: Influence & Image, C-SPAN featured the history of the first ladies in chronological order during two seasons broadcast over the course of one year. Season 1, featuring Martha Washington through Ida McKinley, ran from February 25, 2013 to June 10, 2013. Three months later, the following season ran, featuring Edith Roosevelt through Michelle Obama, from September 9, 2013 to February 10, 2014. C-SPAN devoted most of the 90-minute episodes to a single first lady, but some early programs covered several within one broadcast. The Eleanor Roosevelt episode was 2 hours long.

The live broadcasts included commentary from in-studio historians, journalists and experts, as well as calls and interaction from viewers and social media users, and pre-recorded on-location footage at historical sites of significance to the featured first lady. The first season relied mainly on letters and written materials to provide insight into the first ladies’ lives. As the second season moved into modern times, the broadcasts included audio and video of the women.

First Ladies: Influence & Image delved into how FLOTUS' role has evolved since the 18th century. The series aimed to underscore how the presidents' wives—who were respectively fashion icons, advocates for their husbands, advisors and champions of their own causes—impacted political, social and White House history.

== Programs ==
Date of first broadcast (with link to video)	First Lady profiled (with link to First Ladies page)	President	Guests
February 25, 2013	Martha Washington (First Ladies)	George Washington	Patricia Brady, Richard Norton Smith
March 4, 2013	Abigail Adams (First Ladies)	John Adams	Edith Gelles, C. James Taylor
March 11, 2013	Martha Jefferson Randolph (First Ladies)	Thomas Jefferson	Catherine Allgor, Edith Mayo
March 11, 2013	Dolley Madison (First Ladies)	James Madison	Catherine Allgor, Edith Mayo
March 18, 2013	Elizabeth Monroe (First Ladies)	James Monroe	Daniel F. Preston, Richard Norton Smith
March 18, 2013	Louisa Adams (First Ladies)	John Quincy Adams	Amanda Mathews, Richard Norton Smith
March 25, 2013	Rachel Jackson (First Ladies)	Andrew Jackson	Patricia Brady, Michael Douglas Henderson
March 25, 2013	Hannah Van Buren (First Ladies)	Martin Van Buren	Patricia Brady, Michael Douglas Henderson
April 1, 2013	Anna Harrison (First Ladies)	William Henry Harrison	Edna Greene Medford, Taylor Stoermer
April 1, 2013	Letitia Tyler (First Ladies)	John Tyler	Edna Greene Medford, Taylor Stoermer
April 1, 2013	Julia Tyler (First Ladies)	John Tyler	Edna Greene Medford, Taylor Stoermer
April 8, 2013	Sarah Polk (First Ladies)	James K. Polk	Paul Finkelman, Conover Hunt
April 8, 2013	Margaret Taylor (First Ladies)	Zachary Taylor	Paul Finkelman, Conover Hunt
April 8, 2013	Abigail Fillmore (First Ladies)	Millard Fillmore	Paul Finkelman, Conover Hunt
April 15, 2013	Jane Pierce (First Ladies)	Franklin Pierce	Ann Covell, Feather Schwartz Foster
April 15, 2013	Harriet Lane (First Ladies)	James Buchanan	Ann Covell, Feather Schwartz Foster
April 22, 2013	Mary Lincoln (First Ladies)	Abraham Lincoln	Richard Norton Smith, Rosalyn Terborg-Penn
April 29, 2013	Eliza Johnson (First Ladies)	Andrew Johnson	Jacqueline Berger, Kendra Hinkle
May 6, 2013	Julia Grant (First Ladies)	Ulysses S. Grant	William Seale, Pamela Sanfilippo
May 13, 2013	Lucy Hayes (First Ladies)	Rutherford B. Hayes	Allida Black, Thomas Culbertson
May 20, 2013	Lucretia Garfield (First Ladies)	James A. Garfield	Carl Sferrazza Anthony
May 20, 2013	Ellen Arthur (First Ladies)	Chester A. Arthur	Carl Sferrazza Anthony
May 27, 2013	Frances Cleveland (First Ladies)	Grover Cleveland	Annette Dunlap, Taylor Stoermer
June 3, 2013	Caroline Harrison (First Ladies)	Benjamin Harrison	Edith Mayo, William Seale
June 10, 2013	Ida McKinley (First Ladies)	William McKinley	Carl Sferrazza Anthony, Richard Norton Smith
September 9, 2013	Edith Roosevelt (First Ladies)	Theodore Roosevelt	Stacy Cordery, Kathleen Dalton
September 16, 2013	Helen Taft (First Ladies)	William Howard Taft	Jane Hampton Cook, Lewis Gould
September 23, 2013	Ellen Wilson (First Ladies)	Woodrow Wilson	John Milton Cooper Jr., Kristie Miller
September 23, 2013	Edith Wilson (First Ladies)	Woodrow Wilson	John Milton Cooper Jr., Kristie Miller
September 30, 2013	Florence Harding (First Ladies)	Warren G. Harding	David Pietrusza, Katherine Sibley
October 7, 2013	Grace Coolidge (First Ladies)	Calvin Coolidge	Cynthia Bittinger, Amity Shlaes
October 14, 2013	Lou Hoover (First Ladies)	Herbert Hoover	Emily Charnock, Annette B. Dunlap
October 21, 2013	Eleanor Roosevelt (First Ladies)	Franklin D. Roosevelt	Allida Black, Douglas Brinkley
October 28, 2013	Bess Truman (First Ladies)	Harry S. Truman	Nicole Anslover, William Seale
November 4, 2013	Mamie Eisenhower (First Ladies)	Dwight D. Eisenhower	Marilyn Irvin Holt, Edith Mayo
November 11, 2013	Jacqueline Kennedy (First Ladies)	John F. Kennedy	Michael Beschloss, Barbara A. Perry
November 18, 2013	Lady Bird Johnson (First Ladies)	Lyndon B. Johnson	Betty Boyd Caroli, Cokie Roberts
November 25, 2013	Pat Nixon (First Ladies)	Richard Nixon	Mary Brennan, Timothy Naftali
December 2, 2013	Betty Ford (First Ladies)	Gerald Ford	Steven M. Ford, Richard Norton Smith
December 9, 2013	Rosalynn Carter (First Ladies)	Jimmy Carter	Jay E. Hakes, Grace Elizabeth Hale
January 13, 2014	Nancy Reagan (First Ladies)	Ronald Reagan	Carl Cannon, Judy Woodruff
January 20, 2014	Barbara Bush (First Ladies)	George H. W. Bush	Jeffrey A. Engel, Myra Gutin
January 27, 2014	Hillary Clinton (First Ladies)	Bill Clinton	David Maraniss, Gail Sheehy
February 3, 2014	Laura Bush (First Ladies)	George W. Bush	Ann Gerhart, Mark Updegrove
February 10, 2014	Michelle Obama (First Ladies)	Barack Obama	Liza Mundy, Krissah Thompson

== Other media ==
PublicAffairs Books published First Ladies: Presidential Historians on the Lives of 45 Iconic American Women, written by Susan Swain and C-SPAN, on April 14, 2015. The work pairs historians together to discuss the lives and legacies of the first ladies. A companion piece to the TV series, the book features historians' takes on the first ladies' personalities, marriages, passions and legacies. Kirkus Reviews said the 496-page book portrays where each first lady came from "and what was truly important to her".

C-SPAN and the White House Historical Association each launched websites to tie in with the series. The sites include essays, educational materials, videos, photographs and historical documents.
