= Recollections of Full Years =

1914 memoir

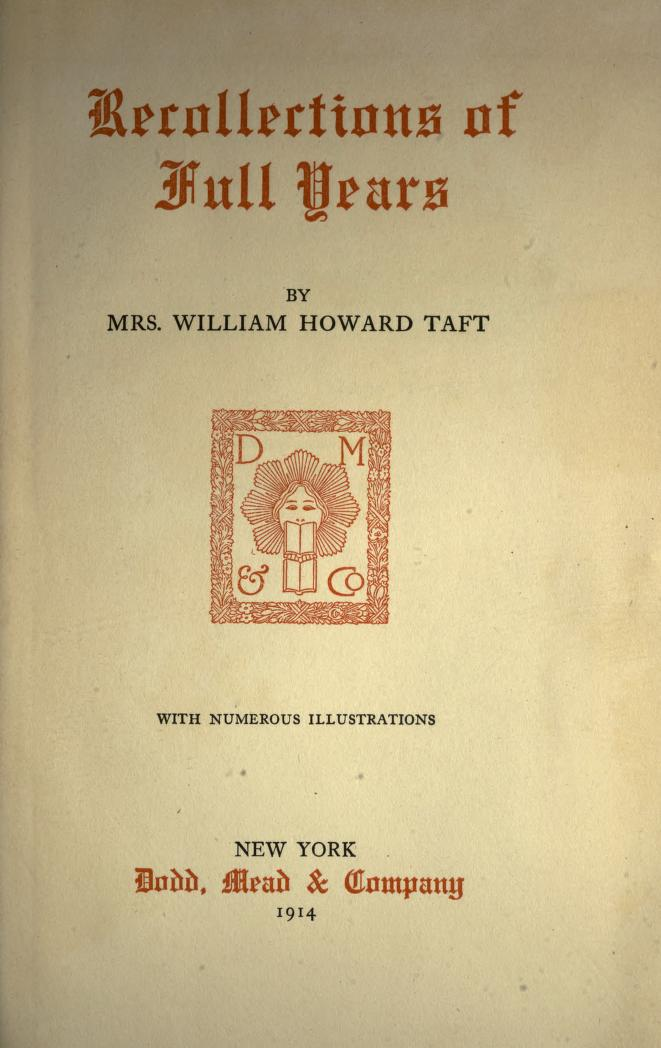
- Title page
- Author: Helen Taft
- Language: English
- Genre: Memoir
- Publication date: 1914

Recollections of Full Years is a 1914 memoir by Helen Taft, a First Lady of the United States and wife of William Howard Taft. The memoirs were the first to be published by a first lady. The book serves as "the most important source of information" about Helen Taft.

== Background ==
Helen Herron Taft was the wife of William Howard Taft and the First Lady of the United States from 1909 to 1913. She married William in 1886, and lived with him as he served as a justice on the Ohio Superior Court and was made Solicitor General of the United States in 1890. Helen involved herself in the Washington social life and was involved in her husband's political career, for instance playing a major role in convincing William to decline appointment to the Supreme Court of the United States as she wanted him to become president. She was then 'first lady of the Philippines' as William led demilitarization of the islands. The couple moved back to Washington when William was made Theodore Roosevelt's Secretary of War. She next supported William's bid for the Presidency in 1908. She was involved in Taft's political career and the social fabric of D.C.

== Publication ==
The idea of publishing her memoirs was first proposed by The Delineator, a women's magazine. The journalist Eleanor Franklin Egan proposed that Helen write several articles for the magazine in early 1913. Taft did not like the proposal, instead suggesting that her daughter, Helen Taft Manning, undertake a similar project. Egan and the younger Helen worked to write a narrative about the former First Lady's time in office, drawing upon a memoir by Archibald Butt and Helen herself. The two made the story a first-person narrative and took the project to the publishing company Dodd, Mead & Co., proposing the title to be Recollections of Full Years.

Staffers at Dodd, Mead & Co. suggested changing the title to Recollections of a President's Wife, a title which they thought would sell better, telling the Tafts they were "awfully keen to make a great killing with Mrs. Taft's book, and we feel that just the right title is a very important point." The Tafts considered the proposed alternate title to sound "foolish or cheap" and attempted to not go through with publication. However, Helen eventually signed a contract providing for a $2,000 advance and 50% of profits on April 20, 1914. Over half of the book focuses on the Tafts' time in the Philippines. It was published in late 1914 around the outbreak of World War I. Despite being "advertised widely", the book had only sold 2,300 copies after two years, and had not earned the advance back as late as 1921. Lewis Gould, a biographer of Helen Taft, concludes that the book "soon faded from memory", noting that when Henry Steele Commager reviewed Edith Wilson's My Memoir in 1939 he described it as "the first volume of memoirs [...] ever written by the wife of an American President".

== Reception ==
The New York Times considered some revelations in the book to be "of startling interest". A review in The Oakland Tribune described the book as "a most interesting and intimate account of her exceptionally prominent life, politically and socially". The New York Sun wrote that it contained "bright, witty, delightfully entertaining reminiscences". Frederic L. Paxson, writing in The Mississippi Valley Historical Review in 1915, noted that "although this book gives only the lighter and less controversial elements of [William Howard Taft's] career, and although it is based largely upon recollection and inaccurate domestic sources, it is full testimony as to the quality of the Taft family."

Lewis Gould, a biographer of Helen Taft, wrote that "the book has a sense of missed opportunity to be more candid about what she went through between 1909 and 1913, but in parts her narrative is interesting and informative".
