= Letters of Mrs. Adams, the Wife of John Adams =

1840 collection of letters

The Letters of Mrs. Adams, the Wife of John Adams is an 1840 book that contains selected correspondence of Abigail Adams, the second first lady of the United States. The book was published by Charles C. Little and James Brown and edited by Charles Francis Adams Sr.

== Background and publication ==
The book includes letters written from 1761 to 1814. A majority of them were written to Adams' husband, John. Two of them date to before the couple were married. Other letters selected were addressed to people including her son, John Quincy, and Adams' sisters and nieces living in New England. The first letter was written when Adams was seventeen years old.

The Adams family included many avid writers, who wrote content they intended to remain private and content for the public. Letters and diaries, private content, were carefully distanced from what would be published. Charles Francis Adams, Abigail's grandson, felt that the earlier generations of his family had, according to Earl N. Habert, suffered from "serious historical distortion". To respond to this, he decided to publish letters that had, to that point, remained private. It was his hope that they would "furnish an exact transcription of the feelings of the writer" and be "susceptible of no misconception." Accordingly, Charles began editing volumes from his family's papers.

An introduction to the book was written by Charles, who also served as the book's editor. A second edition was published in 1840, also by Liddle and Brown. As a result of the book's success, a book of Letters of John Adams, addressed to his Wife was published the following year. Further editions of the Letters of Mrs. Adams were published in 1841 and 1848.

== Reception ==
The North American Review described the first volume of letters as "charming specimens of epistolary composition" but felt their greatest value was as a work expressing Adams' unedited opinion on her life. They concluded their review by saying the book had left them unsatisfied because they wanted more similar letters and requested another edition be published. The Christian Examiner and General Review also published a review praising Adams and the collection, as did The Christian Review, which also considered Charles Francis Adams's introduction "very interesting".

It was an early publication of content by a first lady. The historian Charles W. Akers wrote in 1980 that the book had been popular and served as the main way that readers knew who Adams was until the Adams Papers were "opened".
