= White House History =

American periodical

White House History is a quarterly periodical published by the White House Historical Association, a private, non-profit organization whose mission is to enhance the public's understanding, appreciation, and enjoyment of the White House, the official residence and workplace of the president of the United States.

White House History features articles on the White House, typically relating to the house's use and life on the premises. White House History is not a political forum, although its subject matter includes political history.

White House History serves a varied readership, including historians, and professionals and lay people in the areas of American political and cultural history, architecture, fine and decorative arts, and landscape design.

== History and profile ==
Founded by historian William Seale and first published in 1983, White House History was issued twice each year from in 1997 until 2015, when it became a quarterly publication. The first 30 issues are available in bound collection sets. More recent issues are available individually.

Topics have included such themes as inaugurations, architecture and renovations, White House kitchens, presidential retreats, presidential portraiture, White House grounds and gardens, transportation and travel, fashion, presidential kin, the White House neighborhood, and the White House and the movies. Several issues have focused on a particular presidential administration, including those of John Adams, Thomas Jefferson, James Madison, Martin Van Buren, James Polk, James Buchanan, Abraham Lincoln, Dwight Eisenhower, and John Kennedy.

White House History is sold by subscription; single copies as well as bound collection sets of back issues are also available.
