= View from the East Wing =

2026 memoir by Jill Biden

- Author: Jill Biden
- Language: English
- Publisher: Gallery Books
- Publication date: June 2, 2026
- Publication place: United States
- Pages: 274
- ISBN: 978-1668222881
- OCLC: 1582427719
- Dewey Decimal: 973.934/092
- LC Class: E918.B54

View from the East Wing: A Memoir is a 2026 memoir by Jill Biden, the former first lady of the United States. The book covers her four years in the White House during the presidency of her husband, Joe Biden, including the family's response to the 2024 presidential election and his decision to withdraw from the race. It was published on June 2, 2026, by Gallery Books, an imprint of Simon & Schuster.

== Publication ==
View from the East Wing was published in the United States by Gallery Books on June 2, 2026. The first hardcover edition is 288 pages. The audiobook, narrated by Jill Biden, was released simultaneously by Simon & Schuster Audio. The UK edition was released on June 4, 2026.

== Synopsis ==
The memoir is structured as a first‑person narrative. Biden describes her first days as first lady, which coincided with the COVID-19 pandemic and the aftermath of the January 6 U.S. Capitol attack. She discusses her work on behalf of military families, cancer initiatives, vaccine awareness, and education, as well as her decision to continue teaching as a professor at a community college during her husband's presidency, which made her the first sitting first lady to hold an outside job.

Biden also recounts personal difficulties, including the death of her stepson Beau Biden, the drug addiction of her stepson Hunter Biden, and the family's response to the 2024 presidential election. She describes watching the June 2024 debate between Joe Biden and Donald Trump, during which she considered whether her husband was having a stroke or had been drugged, writing: "To this day, I still don't know what happened." She also reveals that she left a hidden message for the incoming Trump family at the White House on Inauguration Day 2025, although she does not disclose what it said.

The memoir describes her interactions with Melania Trump, whom she describes as "polite and controlled" after a phone call following the 2024 assassination attempt on Donald Trump, but also notes that Trump declined an invitation to the ceremonial inauguration tea. Biden also reflects on the destruction of the East Wing, which was demolished to make way for a Trump administration ballroom project. She writes: "The innards of the East Wing were spread out for everyone to see, like a rare and precious animal that had been hunted down and killed."

The book also includes Biden's reflections on her role as first lady. She writes: "Being First Lady could feel like a catch-22. You were encouraged to use your platform to do good, but not to be too aggressive in pursuing policy goals, lest you be seen as overreaching."

== Reception ==
The Kirkus Reviews assessment, published after the book's release, called it "a smart, revealing memoir by a presidential partner of skill and consequence," noting the "few surprises" in Biden's narrative, including her explanation for Joe Biden's debate performance. The Hindustan Times review described the memoir as "at turns delusional, sappy, resentful and in a weirdly irresistible way revelatory of the former first lady's agitated state of mind." The review also noted that Biden refers to Donald Trump by name only sparingly, instead calling him "Joe's opponent" or "the president-elect."

A review in The New York Times described the book as "trim, toned and beatific," noting that its strength lies in "small details," such as the cotton balls used to simulate snow at the White House and the family cat, Willow. The review also highlighted Biden's background as an English professor and her use of a "careful catalog of small details."

The Wall Street Journal offered a more critical assessment, characterizing the memoir as a narrative of "regrets" and questioning its omissions. CNN's Jake Tapper was similarly skeptical, writing that Jill Biden's assertion that her husband showed no signs of cognitive decline in the summer of 2024 is "very difficult to believe, if not just downright false." Tapper pointed to reporting he and Alex Thompson conducted with over 200 Democratic insiders for their book Original Sin, which he said detailed "mental acuity issues that got much more pronounced in 2023 and 2024 but had reared their heads before then."

=== Political reactions ===
The book drew criticism from some Democrats who said it reopened wounds from the 2024 election, which they had been trying to move past. John Morgan, a Florida trial attorney and major fundraiser for Biden's 2024 campaign, told the Los Angeles Times that the memoir was "unhelpful" and that Biden "was the main problem. She loved the life and didn't want it to end." Meghan Hays, a former White House aide to Joe Biden, said on C-SPAN: "We have a lot of momentum in our favor … and when we get pulled back into conversations about age and the election in '24, it's never gonna be a good place for Democrats."

== See also ==
- List of memoirs by first ladies of the United States
