= A White House Diary =

1970 memoir

- Author: Lady Bird Johnson
- Language: English
- Genre: Memoir
- Published: 1970
- Publisher: Holt, Rinehart and Winston
- Pages: 860

A White House Diary is a 1970 memoir by Lady Bird Johnson.

== Writing and publication ==
Lady Bird Johnson regularly made tape-recorded notes of her daily activities while her husband was president. The diary totaled 1.75 million words of voice recordings when Lyndon left office, and Lady Bird worked to trim it by a factor of about seven to be published. She said that the finished book was a record of "hopefully significant days, but some quiet days" as well. The 806-page book was published on November 2, 1970, by Holt, Rinehart and Winston.

== Reception ==
A review in The American Historical Review praised the book, which was published around the same time as Lyndon's The Vantage Point, for its insight into the American presidency. Jean Stafford in The New York Review of Books considered the book to have a "lubberly vocabulary" and said Johnson could instead have "stuck to her homey colloquialisms". Stafford thought the book's importance was "questionable" because Johnson didn't go into much detail about the political side of the presidency and included little gossip. Stafford concluded that "It is a harmless book, but it is very long."

James Brady of The Washington Post described the book as "a simply splendid account," stating that "there never has been, and perhaps never will be, such an intimate glance of power in its private moments." He concluded that the work was "extraordinary."

Similarly, a review published in The New York Times offered a favorable assessment, characterizing the book as "intensely personal" and containing "fascinating" details.

Dorothy Rabinowitz, writing for Commentary, referred to the book as "a full, and disturbing, replay of the nation's troubles during Johnson's term as president."
