= William Seale =

American historian, author (1939–2019)

- Born: August 7, 1939; Beaumont, Texas, U.S.
- Died: November 21, 2019 (aged 80); Dallas, Texas, U.S.
- Education: Southwestern University; Duke University
- Occupations: Historian, author
- Writing career
- Notable work: White House History (journal)

William Seale (August 7, 1939 – November 21, 2019) was an American historian and author whose primary interest was in historic architecture, particularly that of the White House, state capitols, and historic governors' mansions. He was "instrumental in preserving many historic structures across the country", including private homes. In 1983, he founded the scholarly journal White House History, which he edited for the White House Historical Association until his death.

== Biography ==
Seale was born on August 7, 1939, in Beaumont, Texas, the son of William Seale, a contractor who studied historic building practices, and Eugenia Broocks Seale, who "had an eye for interiors" and furnishings. He attended Southwestern University (BA, 1961) and Duke University (MA, 1964; PhD, 1965). He taught for several years at Lamar University, the University of Houston, the University of South Carolina, and Columbia University. In 1965, he moved to Washington, D.C., and the following year, he married Lucinda Smith of Alexandria, Virginia. The couple lived in Alexandria and had two sons.

From 1973 to 1974, Seale was curator of cultural history at the Smithsonian Institution. He then became an independent scholar, publishing many books and essays, and frequently appearing on C-SPAN to discuss the history and preservation of significant American buildings.

Seale's restoration projects include the state capitols of Michigan, Ohio, Kansas, Florida, Mississippi, Alabama and historical consultation on the capitols of Minnesota, Alaska, and New Jersey. Historic houses include Dodona Manor, the Gen. George C. Marshall House, Leesburg, Virginia; Ten Chimneys, home of Alfred Lunt and Lynn Fontanne; Genesee Depot, Wisconsin; George Eastman House, Rochester, New York; Ximenez-Fatio House, St. Augustine, Florida; Old Governor's Mansion (Milledgeville, Georgia); and many others over a period of twenty-five years.

In 2013, he served as a consultant and panelist for the Cable-Satellite Public Affairs Network (C-SPAN) production First Ladies: Influence and Image, which ran for two seasons.

Seale died on November 21, 2019, aged 80, in Dallas, Texas, following a long illness.

== Bibliography ==
An incomplete list of works written by William Seale:

- Texas Riverman: The Life and Times of Captain Andrew Smyth (University of Texas Press, 1966)
- Sam Houston’s Wife: A Biography of Margaret Lea Houston (University of Oklahoma Press, 1970)
- Texas in Our Time (Hendrick-Long, 1972)
- The Tasteful Interlude: American Interiors Through the Camera’s Eye (Praeger Publishers, 1975)
- Temples of Democracy: The State Capitols of the USA (Harcourt 1976)
- Courthouse (Bonanza, 1977)
- Restoration of the Kentucky Governor’s Mansion: A History (Harmony House, 1984)
- The Virginia Governor’s Mansion: A History, with Henry-Russell Hitchcock (Virginia State Archives, 1985)
- The President’s House: A History, 2 vols. (White House Historical Association, 1986 and 2008)
- Recreating the Historic House Interior (American Association for State and Local History Press, 1988)
- Restoration of the Michigan Capitol, State of Michigan, (Kent State University Press, 1988), with Erik Kvalsvik
- Domestic Views: Historic Houses of the Colonial Dames of America (American Institute of Architects, 1992)
- Of Houses and Time: Personal History of the National Trust Houses (Abrams, 1992)
- Michigan’s Capitol (University of Michigan Press, 1995)
- The White House Garden (White House Historical Association, 1996)
- Domes of America, with Eric Oxendorf (Pomegranate Press, 1998)
- The Alexandria Library Company: A History (Alexandria Library Company, 2001)
- Alexandria: Historic Guide (City of Alexandria, Va., 2003)
- The White House: History of an American Idea (White House Historical Association, 2005)
- The Imperial Season: America's Capital in the Time of the First Ambassadors, 1893–1918 (Smithsonian Press, 2013)
- Blair House: The President's Guest House (2016)
- A White House of Stone (2017)
