= Eleanor Franklin Egan =

American journalist and foreign correspondent

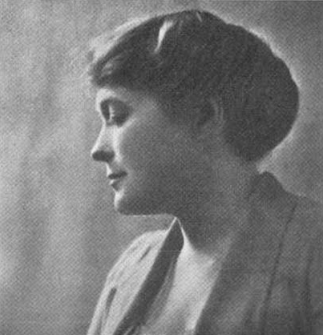
Eleanor Franklin Egan, 1921

Eleanor Franklin Egan (April 28, 1879 — January 17, 1925) was an American journalist and foreign correspondent for the Saturday Evening Post.

== Early life ==
Bertha Eleanor Pedigo was born in 1879 (some sources give 1877), the daughter of Henry Pedigo and Bina Graves Pedigo. She lived for a time at the Rose Orphan Home in Terre Haute, Indiana, and was raised by her adoptive family in Kansas City, Missouri.

== Career ==
Eleanor Pedigo Franklin moved to New York City in 1898 in search of an acting career, having done some theatre work in Kansas City. From there she became a theatre critic at Leslie's Weekly magazine, and eventually moved into political journalism. In 1903 she was sent to Japan and later Russia; she covered the Russo-Japanese War, and the Russian Revolution for Leslie's and, from 1915 to 1925, World War I and its aftermath for the Saturday Evening Post. In 1915, she survived the deadly submarine attack on the British passenger ship Barulos. Her reporting from Armenia in 1919 featured eyewitness accounts of desperation:

I did not believe that there were people anywhere down on their knees eating grass. I thought it very likely that starving persons might go out and gather grasses and greens of various sorts to be prepared for food, but that men, women and children should gather like cattle in herds to graze, this I did not believe – not until I saw it.

She moved to the Philippines to co-edit the Manila Times with her second husband, and served as first president of the Philippine Anti-Tuberculosis Society while she was there. She served on the advisory committee of the 1922 Conference on the Limitation of Armament, in Washington, D. C.

Egan helped First Lady Helen Herron Taft to write her memoirs. She also published The War in the Cradle of the World (1917), about British military actions in Iraq. Her book is still studied as an early 20th-century American analysis of the region. Egan had opposed women's suffrage in print, but published an essay admitting to a change of heart soon after suffrage was won: "I feel like apologizing to the women of the combat battalions who have done all the fighting and who now bear all the scars."

== Personal life ==
Eleanor Pedigo married twice; first, briefly, to Joel Dalbey Franklin in 1895; they divorced. Her second husband was journalist and publicist Martin Egan; they married in 1905, in Japan. She died in New York in 1925, aged 45 years, from pneumonia secondary to giardia, a food- and water-borne parasite; among the honorary pallbearers at her funeral were Herbert Hoover, James Harbord, and Newton W. Gilbert. Other prominent attendees were Walter Lippmann, Kathleen Norris, Frank Munsey, Melville Elijah Stone, and Thomas W. Lamont.
