= Bibliography of Lyndon B. Johnson =

The Lyndon B. Johnson bibliography includes major books and articles about President Lyndon B. Johnson, his life, and presidential administration. Kent B. Germany in his review of the historiography noted in 2009 that Johnson has been the subject of 250 Ph.D. dissertations, well over one hundred books, and many scholarly articles. The New York Times and the Washington Post published 7600 articles on him during his presidency. Only a select subgroup are listed here, chiefly those reviewed by the major scholarly journals.

Johnson's reputation has not recovered. Germany emphasizes the decline of Johnson's reputation:

The man who was elected to the White House by one of the widest margins in U.S. history and pushed through as much legislation as any other American politician now seems to be remembered best by the public for succeeding an assassinated hero, steering the country into a quagmire in Vietnam, cheating on his saintly wife, exposing his stitched-up belly, using profanity, picking up dogs by their ears, swimming naked with advisers in the White House pool, and emptying his bowels while conducting official business. Of all those issues, Johnson's reputation suffers the most from his management of the Vietnam War, something that has overshadowed his civil rights and domestic policy accomplishments and caused Johnson himself to regret his handling of "the woman I really loved--the Great Society."

== Secondary sources ==
- Lerner, Mitchell B. A Companion to Lyndon B. Johnson (2012), 29 scholarly articles with an emphasis on historiography excerpt

=== Biographies ===
External videos
- Booknotes interview with Robert Caro on Means of Ascent, April 29, 1990, C-SPAN

- Caro, Robert A. The Years of Lyndon Johnson (4 volumes as of 2012): The Path to Power (1982); Means of Ascent (1990); Master of the Senate (2002); The Passage of Power (2012). The most detailed biography, extends to early 1964.

External videos
- Booknotes interview with Robert Dallek on Lone Star Rising: Lyndon Johnson and His Times, 1908–1960, September 22, 1991, C-SPAN

- Dallek, Robert. Lone Star Rising: Lyndon Johnson and His Times, 1908–1960 (1991); Flawed Giant: Lyndon Johnson and His Times, 1961–1973 (1998); also: Lyndon B. Johnson: Portrait of a President (2004). A 400-page abridged version of his 2 volume scholarly biography.
- Fernlund, Kevin J. Lyndon B. Johnson and Modern America (Vol. 25 of The Oklahoma Western Biographies). Norman: University of Oklahoma Press, 2009. A short study of Johnson's career, with an emphasis on Texas and the American West (175 pages).
- Kearns Goodwin, Doris. Lyndon Johnson and the American Dream (1977). A character study.
- Lerner, Mitchell B. A Companion to Lyndon B. Johnson (2012), Scholarly essays on all aspects of Johnson's career
- Woods, Randall. LBJ: Architect of American Ambition (2006). A highly detailed scholarly biography (1000 pages).

=== Presidential years ===
- Altschuler, Bruce E.; LBJ and the Polls U Presses of Florida, 1990
- Bernstein, Irving. Guns or Butter: The Presidency of Lyndon Johnson 1994.
- Bornet, Vaughn Davis. The Presidency of Lyndon B. Johnson. 1983
- Burns, Richard Dean and Joseph M. Siracusa. The A to Z of the Kennedy–Johnson Era (2009)
- Cross, James C. Around the World with LBJ. 2008, ISBN 978-0-292-71768-8
- Daynes, Byron W. and Glen Sussman. White House Politics and the Environment: Franklin D. Roosevelt to George W. Bush (Texas A&M UP, 2010) online; pp. 59–65 on Johnson.
- Divine, Robert A., ed. The Johnson Years. Vol. 1: Foreign Policy, the Great Society and the White House. 1981; essays by scholars; excerpt
- Divine, Robert A., ed. The Johnson Years. Vol. 2: Vietnam, the Environment, and Science. 1987; essays by scholars
- Divine, Robert A., ed. The Johnson Years. Vol. 3: LBJ at Home and Abroad. 1994; essays by scholars
- Ellis, Sylvia. Freedom's Pragmatist: Lyndon Johnson and Civil Rights. Gainesville, FL: University Press of Florida, 2013.
- Finley, Keith M. Delaying the Dream: Southern Senators and the Fight Against Civil Rights, 1938-1965 (Baton Rouge, LSU Press, 2008).
- Firestone, Bernard J., and Robert C. Vogt, eds. Lyndon Baines Johnson and the Uses of Power. (1988); essays by scholars

External videos
- Booknotes interview with Jeff Shesol on Mutual Contempt: Lyndon Johnson, Robert Kennedy and the Feud that Defined a Decade, November 30, 1997, C-SPAN

- Gould, Lewis L. Lady Bird Johnson and the Environment. 1988.
- Hodgson, Godfrey. JFK and LBJ: The Last Two Great Presidents (Yale UP, 2015) excerpt
- Kalman, Laura. The Long Reach of the Sixties: LBJ, Nixon, and the Making of the Contemporary Supreme Court (Oxford University Press, 2017).
- Kesler, Charles, Alexander Riley, and Christopher Ellis. "Rethinking the Great Society and the LBJ Presidency: Charles Kesler." in Reflecting on the 1960s at 50 (Routledge, 2020) pp. 54–66.
- Lichtenstein, Nelson, ed. Political Profiles: The Johnson Years. 1976. short biographies of 400+ key politicians.
- Longley, Kyle. LBJ's 1968: Power, Politics, and the Presidency in America's Year of Upheaval (2018) excerpt
- Mann, Robert. The Walls of Jericho: Lyndon Johnson, Hubert Humphrey, Richard Russell, and the Struggle for Civil Rights. 1996.
- Melosi, Martin V. "Environmental Policy" in A Companion to Lyndon B. Johnson, ed. by Mitchell B. Lerner. (Blackwell, 2012) pp. 187–209.
- Melosi, Martin V. "Lyndon Johnson and Environmental Policy,' in Robert Divine, ed., The Johnson Years, Volume Two: Vietnam, The Environment and Science (U of Kansas Press, 1987), pp. 113–149
- Redford, Emmette S., and Marlan Blissett. Organizing the Executive Branch: The Johnson Presidency. 1981.
- Shesol, Jeff. Mutual Contempt: Lyndon Johnson, Robert Kennedy, and the Feud That Shaped a Decade 1997.
- Unger, Irwin The Best of Intentions: the triumphs and failures of the Great Society under Kennedy, Johnson, and Nixon: Doubleday, 1996 ISBN 0-385-46833-4
- White, Theodore H. The Making of the President, 1964 1965.
- Woods, Randall B. Prisoners of Hope: Lyndon B. Johnson, the Great Society, and the Limits of Liberalism (2016), 480pp., a scholarly history.
- Zarefsky, David. President Johnson's War On Poverty: Rhetoric and History (2nd ed. 2005). excerpt
- Zeitz, Joshua. Building the Great Society: Inside Lyndon Johnson's White House (2018) excerpt
- Zelizer, Julian E. The Fierce Urgency of Now: Lyndon Johnson, Congress, and the Battle for the Great Society (2015) excerpt

=== Foreign policy ===
- Andrew, Christopher. For the President's Eyes Only: Secret Intelligence and the American Presidency from Washington to Bush (1995), pp 307–49.
- Brands, H. W. The Wages of Globalism: Lyndon Johnson and the Limits of American Power (1997)
- Brands, H. W. The foreign policies of Lyndon Johnson : beyond Vietnam (1999) online
- Cohen, Warren I., and Nancy Bernkopf Tucker, eds. Lyndon Johnson Confronts the World: American Foreign Policy 1963-1968 (Cambridge University Press, 1994)
- Colman, Jonathan. The Foreign Policy of Lyndon B. Johnson: The United States and the World, 1963–1969 (Edinburgh University Press, 2010) 231 pp. [* Colman, Jonathan. The Foreign Policy of Lyndon B. Johnson: The United States and the World, 1963–1969 (Edinburgh University Press, 2010) 231 pp. online
- Gavin, Francis J. and Mark Atwood Lawrence, eds. Beyond the Cold War: Lyndon Johnson and the New Global Challenges of the 1960s ((Oxford University Press, 2014) 301 pp.
- Kunz, Diane B. ed. The Diplomacy of the Crucial Decade: American Foreign Relations During the 1960s (1994)
- Preston, Thomas. The President and His Inner Circle: Leadership Style and the Advisory Process in Foreign Affairs (2001)

==== Vietnam ====
- Barrett, David Marshall. Advice and Dissent: An Organizational Analysis of the Evolution of Lyndon Johnson's Vietnam Advisory System, 1965–1968. (University of Notre Dame, 1990)
- Berman, Larry. Lyndon Johnson's War: The Road to Stalemate in Vietnam (1991) online
- Casey, Francis Michael. The Vietnam Policy of President Lyndon Baines Johnson in Response to the Theory of the Protracted Conflict as Applied in the Politics of Indochina: A Case Study of Threat Perception and Assessment in the Crisis Management Process of a Pluralistic Society. (Claremont Graduate University, 1976)
- Cherwitz, Richard Arnold. The Rhetoric of the Gulf of Tonkin: A Study of the Crisis Speaking of President Lyndon B. Johnson. (University of Iowa, 1978)
- Goodnight, Lisa Jo. The Conservative Voice of a Liberal President: An Analysis of Lyndon B. Johnson's Vietnam Rhetoric. (Purdue University, 1993)
- Kaiser, David E. American tragedy: Kennedy, Johnson, and the origins of the Vietnam War. (Belknap Press of Harvard University Press, 2000) ISBN 0-674-00225-3
- Logevall, Fredrik Bengt Johan. Fear to Negotiate: Lyndon Johnson and the Vietnam War, 1963–1965. (Yale University, 1993)
- Schandler, Herbert Y. Lyndon Johnson and Vietnam: The unmaking of a president (Princeton University Press, 2014)
- Turner, Kathleen Jane. The Effect of Presidential-Press Interaction on Lyndon B. Johnson's Vietnam War Rhetoric. (Purdue University, 1978)
- Vandiver, Frank E. Shadows of Vietnam: Lyndon Johnson's Wars (1997)

=== Historiography ===
- Germany, Kent B. "Historians and the Many Lyndon Johnsons: A Review Essay" Journal of Southern History (2009) 75#4 pp 1001–1028. in JSTOR
- Lerner, Mitchell B. A Companion to Lyndon B. Johnson (2012), 29 scholarly articles with an emphasis on historiography excerpt
  - Andrew L. Johns, "The Legacy of Lyndon B. Johnson." in A Companion to Lyndon B. Johnson (2011): 504-519.

== Primary sources ==
- Avner, Yehuda The Prime Ministers: An Intimate Narrative of Israeli Leadership (2010). Chapter 14, Deep in the Heart of Texas, ISBN 978-1-59264-278-6
- Barrett David M. "Lyndon B. Johnson's Vietnam Papers: A Documentary Collection" (1997). Documents from LBJ Library and other archives.
- Beschloss Michael R. Taking Charge: The Johnson White House Tapes, 1963–1964 (1997). Transcribed recordings of LBJ's phone calls.
- Califano Joseph A., Jr. The Triumph & Tragedy of Lyndon Johnson (1991). By a former aide.
- Gallup, George H. ed. The Gallup Poll: Public Opinion, 1935–1971, volume 3: 1959–1971 (1972). Summary of poll data.
- Johnson Lyndon B. The Vantage Point: Perspectives on the Presidency, 1963–1969 (1971). LBJ's memoirs.
- Public Papers of the Presidents of the United States: Lyndon B. Johnson (10 volumes, GPO, 1965–70). All speeches and official statements.
- Reedy, George, Lyndon B. Johnson: A Memoir (1982), ISBN 0-8362-6610-2. A memoir by the press secretary.
- Smith, Simon C., ed. The Wilson–Johnson Correspondence, 1964–69 (Ashgate Publishing, Ltd., 2015), Correspondence with British Prime Minister Harold Wilson; a primary source
