= Helen Taft Manning =

American historian

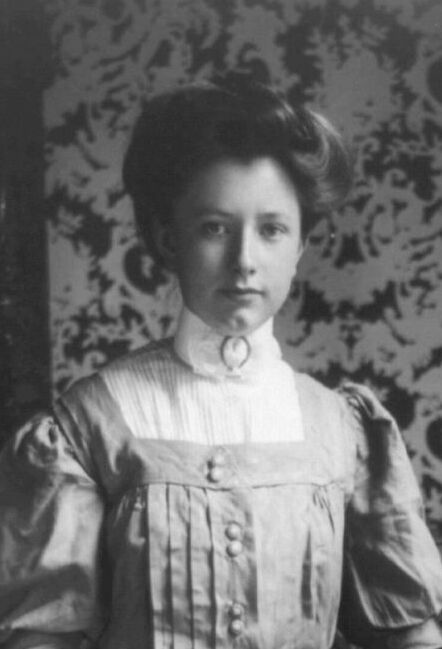
- Taft in 1908
- Born: Helen Herron Taft; August 1, 1891; Cincinnati, Ohio, U.S.
- Died: February 21, 1987 (aged 95); Philadelphia, Pennsylvania, U.S.
- Spouse: Frederick Johnson Manning (m. 1920; died 1966)
- Children: 2

Academic background
- Education: Bryn Mawr College (AB); Yale University (PhD)

Academic work
- Discipline: Historian

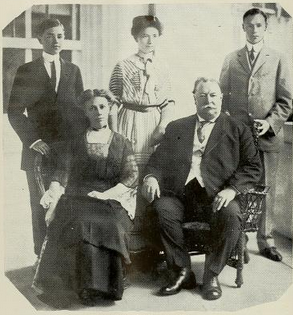
Taft with her parents and brothers (1912)

Helen Herron Taft Manning (August 1, 1891 – February 21, 1987) was an American historian who was dean and acting president of Bryn Mawr College. She was the middle child and only daughter of U.S. president William Howard Taft and his wife Helen Herron.

== Personal life ==
Like her older brother Robert and younger brother Charles, Helen Taft was a high achiever. She was able to reach goals that her mother had not been granted access to due to the social restrictions placed on women of her mother's time. She graduated from The Baldwin School in 1908. She earned a scholarship to attend Bryn Mawr College, where she was a student when her father was elected president in 1908. Taft's studies were interrupted for some time when her mother had a stroke, and was left an invalid. She moved into the White House with her family, and helped her mother to regain body movement and speech. Taft also served as official hostess for many White House functions while her mother was disabled. In December, 1910, she was given a debutante party at the White House.

After her mother recovered, she resumed her studies at Bryn Mawr, graduating in 1915 with a bachelor's degree in history. She was a suffragist, and traveled the country, giving speeches in support of the vote for women and women's rights.

On July 15, 1920, she married Yale history professor Frederick Johnson Manning (1894–1966), who then moved to Swarthmore College. The Mannings had two daughters, who later also pursued careers in teaching:

- Helen Taft Manning Hunter (October 5, 1921 – October 17, 2013)
- Caroline Manning Cunningham (January 18, 1925 – March 23, 2020)

== Academic career ==
In 1917, aged only 26, Taft became dean of Bryn Mawr, and served as the college's acting president in 1919.

She then attended Yale University, where she earned a doctorate in history. Taft's research interests centered on the history of North America in the late eighteenth and early nineteenth centuries. In 1925, she returned to Bryn Mawr as dean and professor of history. Bryn Mawr's class of 1929 dedicated their yearbook to her. She served as dean until 1941, and taught history until she retired in 1957, having become head of the department. She continued to research and to publish during her retirement.

Her papers, which include a collection of personal correspondence, professional work, and her husband's work are stored at Bryn Mawr College.

== Death ==
Taft died in 1987 at age 95 of pneumonia in a nursing home in Philadelphia. She was buried at Church of the Redeemer Cemetery in Bryn Mawr, Pennsylvania.

She was the last surviving child of William Howard Taft, her siblings having died in 1953 and 1983.

== Select bibliography ==
- British colonial government after the American Revolution, 1782-1820. (1933)
- The revolt of French Canada, 1800-1835; a chapter in the history of the British Commonwealth. (1962)
- E.G. Wakefield and the Beauharnois Canal. (1967)

== See also ==
- List of suffragists and suffragettes
