= Krissah Thompson =

American journalist

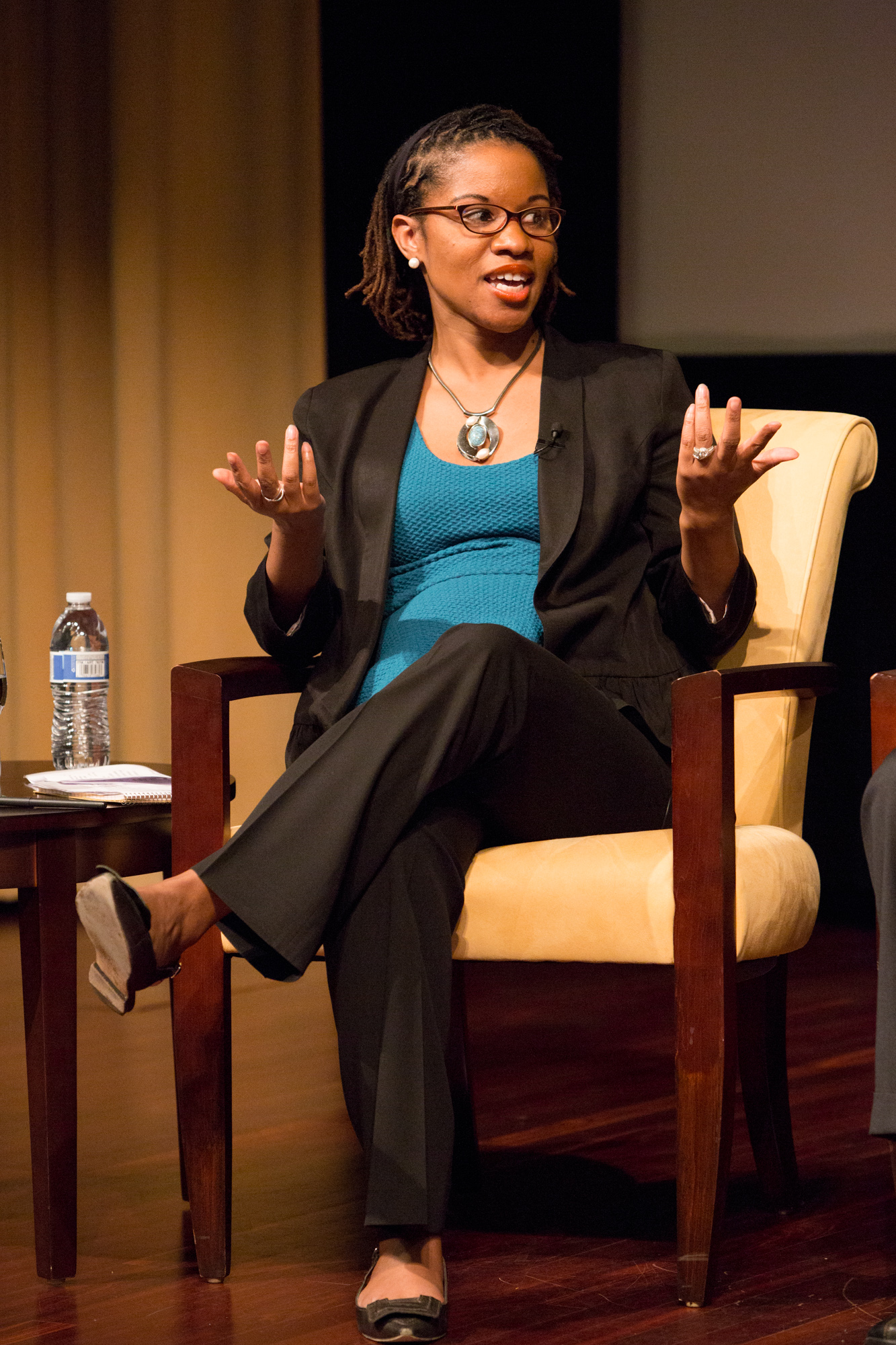
- Thompson discusses First Ladies at the U.S. National Archives in 2015
- Born: 1979 (age 46–47)
- Education: University of Texas at Austin; University of Maryland, College Park
- Employer: The Washington Post

Krissah Williams Thompson (born 1979) is an American journalist at The Washington Post. In 2020, Thompson was named the Managing Editor of Diversity and Inclusion, and is the first African American woman to hold the position of Managing Editor at The Washington Post.

== Early life and education ==
Thompson is from Houston. She was interested in journalism from a young age, joining The Daily Texan as a freshman at The University of Texas. She earned her undergraduate degree at the University of Texas at Austin. At UT-Austin Thompson was a member of the Delta Xi chapter of Alpha Kappa Alpha sorority and held a Chips Quinn Freedom Forum Fellowship. She moved to the University of Maryland, College Park for her graduate studies in journalism. She joined The Washington Post as a summer intern in 2001.

== Research and career ==
Thompson has spent her entire professional career at The Washington Post. She has written for Financial, National Politics and Style. She contributed to Being a Black Man, a collection of essays that covered race and Black identity. During the presidency of Barack Obama, Thompson served as an editor of Style section. She covered Michelle Obama during the second term of Barack Obama.

In the aftermath of the shooting of Michael Brown, Thompson was acting bureau chief during the Ferguson unrest. She co-led the 2018 The Washington Post video-driven programme "The N-Word Project", which encouraged readers of the Post to document and share their views of the n-word. The N-Word Project was nominated for an Emmy Award and shortlisted for an Online Journalism Award.

In 2020, Thompson was made Managing Editor of Diversity and Inclusion at The Washington Post. She is the first African American woman to hold the position of Managing Editor. At the same time, the Post announced it would hire several journalists to cover issues related to race. Thompson has said that she wants The Washington Post "to look like America and the communities we cover”.

== Selected works ==
- Thompson, Krissah (2009-03-18). "Sisterhood of Powerful Black Women in Washington Politics Comes to the Fore". The Washington Post. ISSN 0190-8286.
- Thompson, Krissah (2019-09-20). "We asked black mothers how they find their joy. This is what they said". The Washington Post.
- Williams, Krissah (2005-08-07). "Tenacity Drives Immigrant's Dream". The Washington Post.
