= Edith Mayo =

American historian (born 1940)

Edith P. Mayo
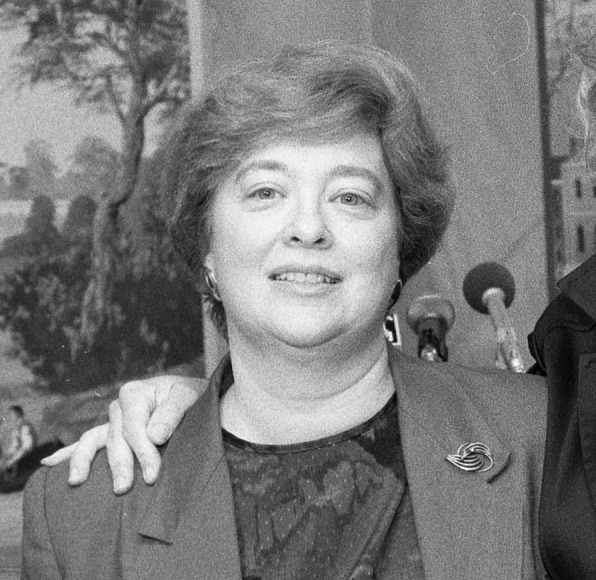
- Mayo in 1988
- Born: March 18, 1940 (age 86)
- Occupations: Historian; Curator

Edith P. Mayo (born March 18, 1940) is an American historian. She is curator emerita for political history at the National Museum of American History. Mayo is a subject matter expert on women's suffrage, specifically African American women's suffrage, and the first ladies of the United States. She has been featured on C-SPAN, CNN, The Morning Call, the Los Angeles Times, PBS, The Baltimore Sun, and The Washington Post regarding her areas of focus. In 2020, she was named an honoree of the National Women's History Alliance.

I think as a nation, we have a very deep-seated ambivalence, even a hostility toward power in the hands of women...

— Edith Mayo, Democracy in America: They Don't Bake Cookies, on CNN

== Early life and education ==
Mayo earned her degree in American History from George Washington University. She was a member of Phi Beta Kappa.

== Career ==
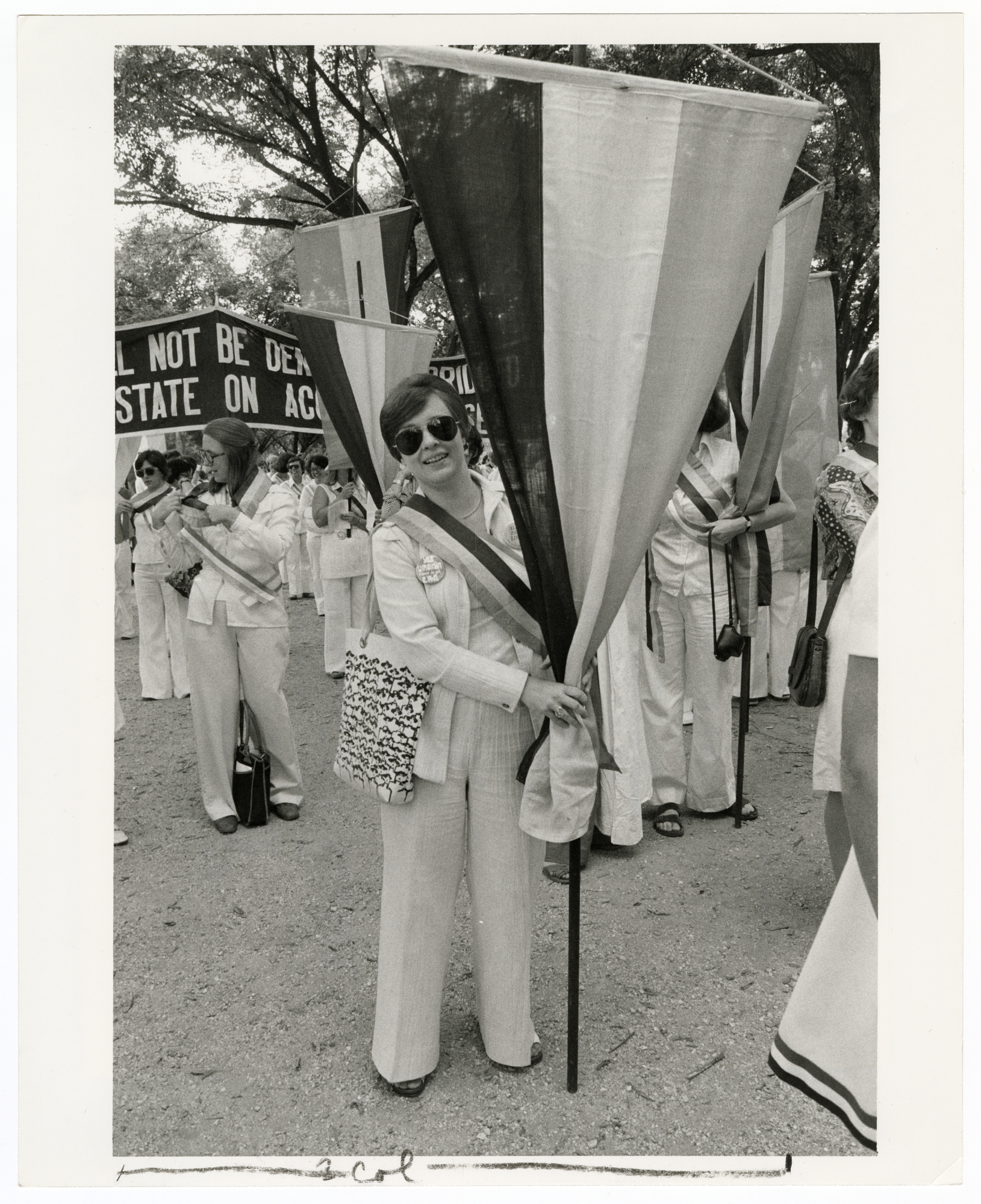
Mayo in 1977 at the Alice Paul Memorial March commememorating the Woman suffrage parade of 1913 with a banner

Mayo was an adjunct professor at George Washington University, where she taught material culture as part of a co-branded program with the university and the Smithsonian Institution. She is a Distinguished Lecturer for the Organization of American Historians. She serves on the board of the Turning Point Suffragist Memorial. In 1995, she wrote the foreword for Doris Stevens's book Jailed for Freedom: American Women Win the Vote.

Mayo curated Rights for Women at the World Financial Center in 1998 and The Pleasure of Your Company at the Museum of Old Salem in Winston-Salem, North Carolina. She curated an exhibition about women entrepreneurs, called Enterprising Women, in 2002 for the Schlesinger Library.

=== Smithsonian Institution ===
In the 1970s, Mayo was Political History Division Assistant Curator at the National Museum of American History. She eventually transitioned into the position of curator emerita, managing major exhibitions about political history, women's history and voting rights.

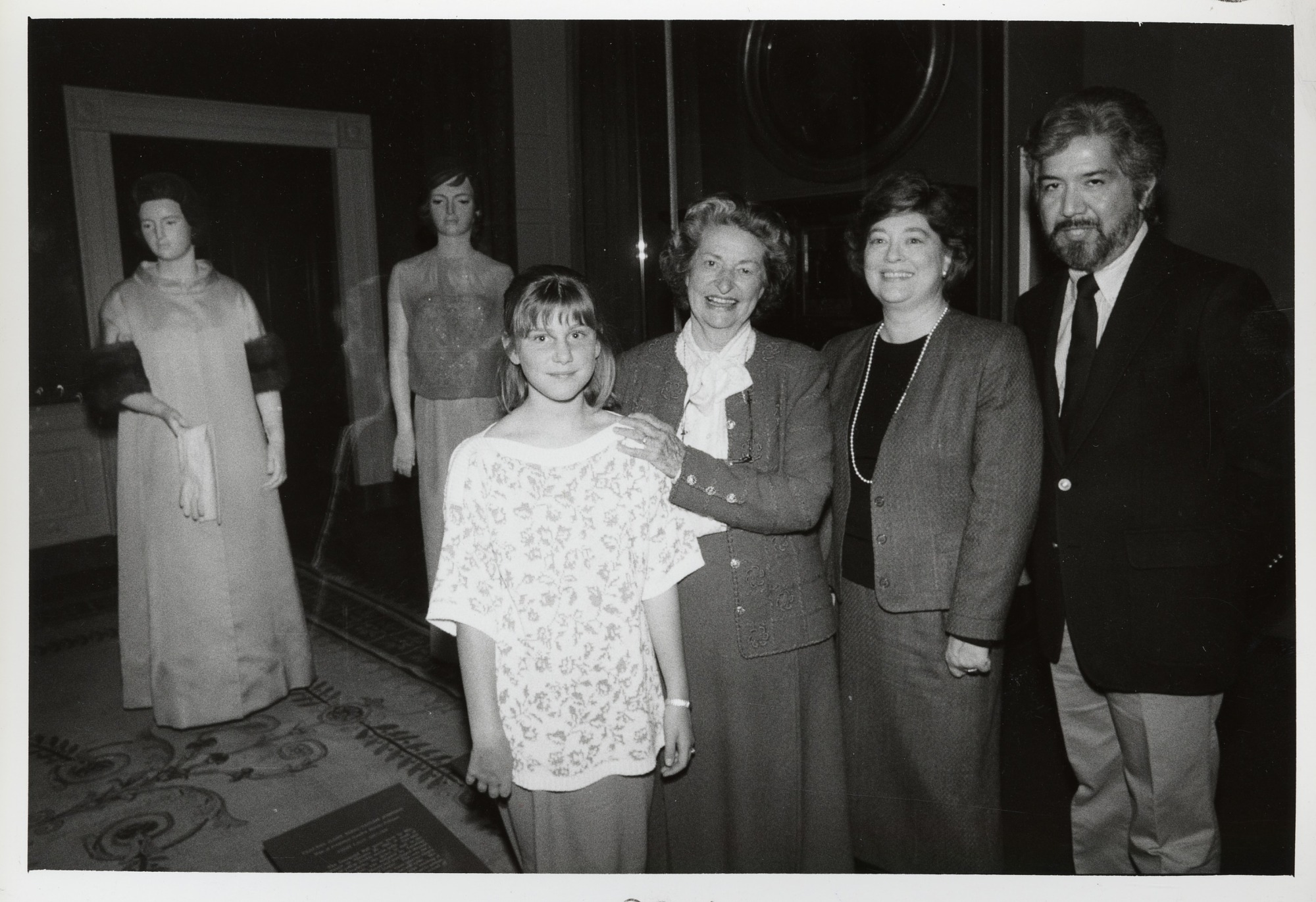
Lady Bird Johnson visits the National Museum of American History First Ladies Hall with granddaughter Claudia (left), and museum employees Edith Mayo and Manuel Melendez (on right), 1987

As curator emerita, she curated the major exhibit, From Parlor to Politics: Women and Reform in America, 1890-1925 in 1990 and in 1992 she curated the museum's major exhibition about the first ladies of the United States: First Ladies exhibition, First Ladies: Political Role and Public Image. The exhibition toured nationally from 2004-2007.

== Author ==
Mayo's book The Smithsonian Book of the First Ladies was published in 1996. Hillary Clinton wrote the foreword.

== Recognition ==
In March 2015, the Fairfax County, Virginia Board of Supervisors named her an honoree for her work at the Smithsonian. In 2020, she was named an honoree by the National Women's History Alliance.

== Selected works ==
- The Smithsonian Book of the First Ladies. New York: Henry Holt & Company (1996). ISBN 978-0-8050-1751-9
- "Teaching the First Ladies Using Material Culture" by Edith P. Mayo, OAH Magazine of History, vol. 15, no. 3, 2001, pp. 22–25. JSTOR
- First Ladies: Political Role and Public Image by Edith Mayo and Lisa Kathleen Graddy, London: Scala Publishers (2004) ISBN 1-85759-336-7
