= My Memoir =

Memoir by Edith Wilson

- Author: Edith Bolling Wilson
- Publisher: Bobbs-Merrill Company
- Publication date: 1938
- Pages: 386
- Dewey Decimal: 973.91/3/092 B

My Memoir is a 1938 memoir by Edith Wilson, a First Lady of the United States and the wife of Woodrow Wilson. She wrote the book as an apologia to defend her husband from perceived attacks, and to preserve his legacy. Critics generally considered the book to be "delightful" as a "collection of episodes,” but especially those writing at publication predicted it would be of little historical value except for its account of Woodrow Wilson's stroke and last days in office. However it has been used by academic historians in the late 20th and early 21st centuries to examine a variety of topics related to Edith Wilson.

== Background ==
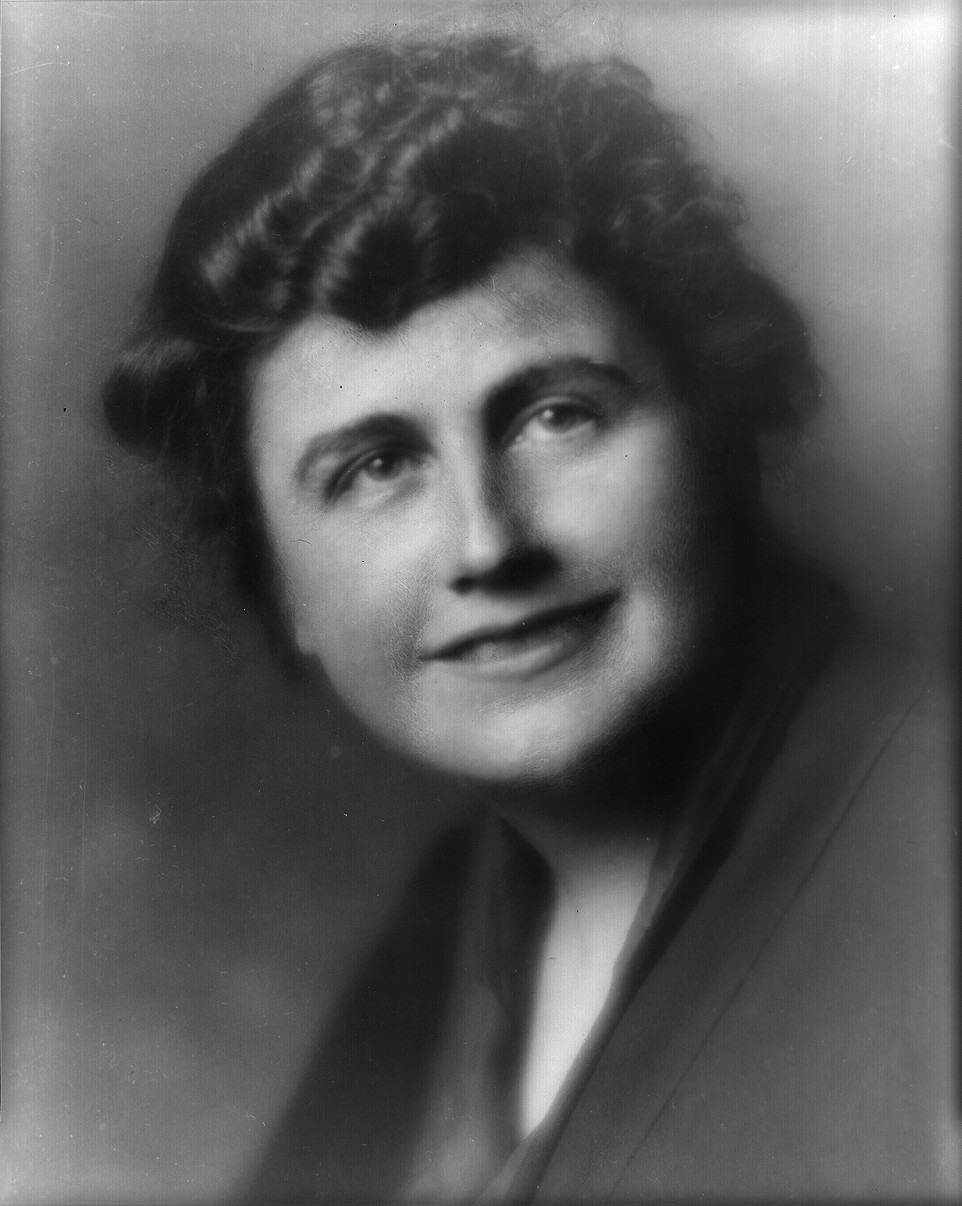
Edith Wilson in 1915

Edith Wilson was the second wife of Woodrow Wilson, and First Lady of the United States from 1915 to 1921. She married the widower Wilson in December 1915, during his first term as president. Edith Wilson is notable for the influential role she played in President Wilson's administration following the severe stroke he suffered in October 1919. For the remainder of her husband's presidency, she managed the office of the president, a role she later described as a "stewardship", and determined which communications and matters of state were important enough to bring to the attention of the bedridden president.

== Publication ==
Wilson wrote the memoir and picked Woodrow's first biographer, Ray Stannard Baker, to create "a fortress around her husband's vulnerabilities and shortcomings and magnif[y] his achievements". Edith published My Memoir in 1938. It was published by Bobbs-Merrill Company. The book focuses on her time with Woodrow with several chapters of background on her life. In the foreword of the book, she wrote of an intent to reveal "the truth concerning personal matters which has often been distorted by the misinformed". Amy R. Slagell and Susan Zaeske, writing in Inventing a Voice: The Rhetoric of American First Ladies of the Twentieth Century, feel that the book had two purposes: to "garner credit for the strenuous work she [Edith] performed in her role as first lady" and to defend her husband's legacy in the face of perceived attacks from the likes of John Singer Sargent and Joseph P. Tumulty (whom she personally disliked). In the memoir, she emphasizes that her husband's doctors urged Edith to serve as "steward" of the presidency.

My Memoir was reprinted in 1993.

== Reception ==
A contemporary review in The Virginia Quarterly Review considered the book not "a document of historical importance" but "delightful" as a "collection of episodes". The reviewer felt the only real value of the book was its account of her husband's stroke and last days in office. A 1939 review published in The Vancouver Sun by David Robertson noted that Woodrow was the "central figure" in the memoir and felt that it "reveals the man" in a book of "rare delicacy". Robertson concluded that while the book would likely never be "accepted as historical documents are", it was "a fascinating and revealing love story" and "at its highest, it is valuable addition to one's knowledge" of Woodrow Wilson. Another review headlined that "Intimate Details Will Boost Sales of 'My Memoir'". The New York Times wrote that "A winning and credible Woodrow Wilson emerges from the grateful pages of My Memoir. That is its sole virtue, although much of it consists of incidental comment on other notables. . ." In The American Historical Review, Charles Callan Tansill wrote in 1940, "it is a pity that the ghost writer who assisted Mrs. Wilson in the preparation of this volume was apparently more concerned with sales than producing a book of permanent historical value." That said, in the late 20th and early 21st centuries, historians used My Memoir to examine topics like race in the Progressive Era and the policy influence of First Ladies, and to reevaluate the role of Wilson as a powerful political player in her own right.

In 2001, Bruce Clayton, writing in The Atlanta Journal-Constitution, described the memoir as a "self-serving apologia". Slagell and Zaeske conclude that although the book has "numerous inaccuracies due to the fact it was written two decades after the events it described and was highly romanticized, it remains the most revealing source we have about the closing days of the Wilson administration." It presents Edith in a very positive light yet also tied her importance directly to her husband, ending when he died in 1924. Phyllis Lee Levin attributes to Edith and her memoir the creation of a public opinion of that "mythologiz[ed] her husband's goals and reputation as ennobled prophet, warrior, and statesman."
