= Helen Herron Taft =

First Lady of the United States from 1909 to 1913

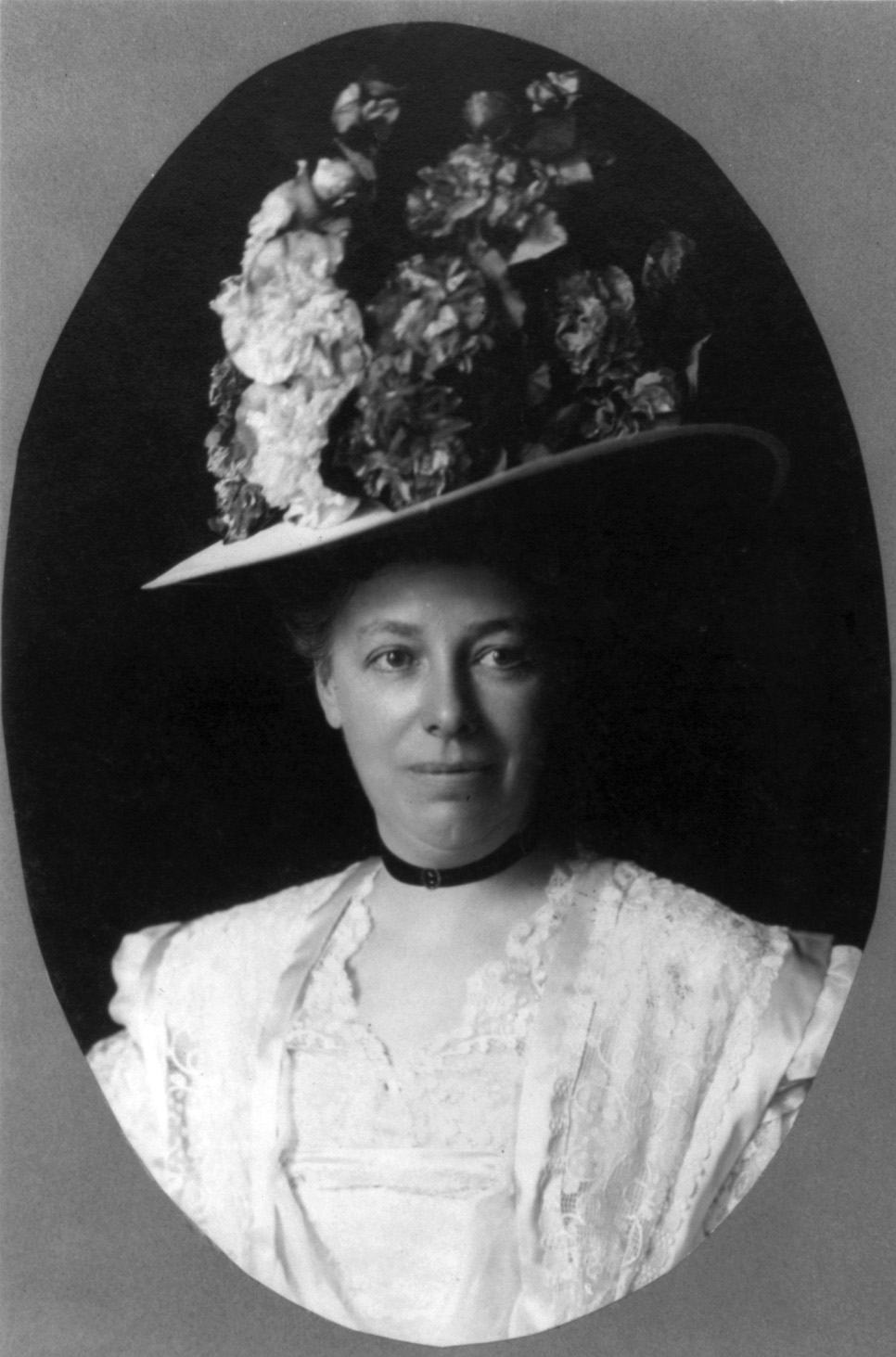
- Taft in 1908

First Lady of the United States
- In role March 4, 1909 – March 4, 1913
- President: William Howard Taft
- Preceded by: Edith Roosevelt
- Succeeded by: Ellen Axson Wilson

Personal details
- Born: Helen Louise Herron; June 2, 1861 Cincinnati, Ohio, U.S.
- Died: May 22, 1943 (aged 81) Washington, D.C., U.S.
- Resting place: Arlington National Cemetery
- Spouse: William Howard Taft (m. 1886; died 1930)
- Children: Robert; Helen; Charles II
- Education: University of Cincinnati

Helen Louise Taft (née Herron; June 2, 1861 – May 22, 1943) was First Lady of the United States from 1909 to 1913 as the wife of President William Howard Taft. Born to a politically well-connected Ohio family, she took an early interest in political life, deciding at the age of 17 that she wished to become first lady. Herron married Taft in 1886, and she guided him throughout his political career, encouraging him to take actions that would bring him closer to the presidency. Accompanying her husband to the Philippines in 1900, she became a prominent socialite in Manila, contributing to US-Philippines relations. After her husband was appointed Secretary of War, she played a significant role in convincing him to run for president in the 1908 presidential election and making the necessary connections to ensure his success.

As first lady, Taft was closely involved in the political aspects of the presidency, regularly sitting in on meetings and serving as her husband's closest advisor. She held a strong influence over the president's decisions, expressing her concerns when she disagreed with him and providing her input on presidential appointments. She also carried out a reorganization of the White House staff and decor. Inspired by her experience in the Philippines, she converted the White House lawn and the West Potomac Park into social hubs with regular live shows and events. Her decision to plant cherry trees in the park proved to be a success, creating a popular tourist attraction. Taft's influence as first lady was cut short by a stroke two months into her tenure, permanently limiting her mobility and leaving her absent for a year while she partially recovered.

Though President Taft was relieved that his term had ended, Helen Taft was upset by his defeat for reelection. She remained active after leaving the White House, supporting the Red Cross during World War I and participating in activities for the Colonial Dames of America. She was widowed in 1930, and was buried beside her husband in Arlington National Cemetery after her death in 1943.

== Early life ==
=== Childhood ===
Helen Herron was born on June 2, 1861, in Cincinnati as the fourth of eleven children, the daughter of Harriet Collins Herron and lawyer John Williamson Herron. Throughout her life, she went by "Nellie". Her father was an associate of two future presidents: he was a college classmate of Benjamin Harrison and a law partner of Rutherford B. Hayes, while her mother was the daughter and the sister of U.S. congressmen. Growing up around politics, Herron developed a love for campaigning. She was also musically inclined as a child, eventually becoming proficient in the piano.

Herron's many siblings, eight of whom survived to adulthood, made life complicated for her family, causing her to develop a personal insecurity and distance herself from her family. As a teenager, Herron would rebel against the societal expectations for upper class women; by the age of 15 she had secretly begun smoking cigarettes, drinking whiskey, and gambling. Seeking a channel for her ambition and independence, she enrolled in Cincinnati's prestigious Miss Nourse School for Girls where she was educated in many subjects, including several languages. She then attended Miami University, and she also briefly attended the University of Cincinnati.

Herron took an interest in law when she was young, often reading her father's legal books at his law office. In 1877, she accompanied her parents when they visited President Hayes and stayed for several weeks at the White House. Her younger sister Lucy Hayes Herron was baptized at that event and named for Mrs. Hayes. This visit instilled in Herron a strong desire to return to the White House as first lady, one that she would often present to her eventual husband.

=== Early career and courtship ===
Herron long wished to leave Ohio, feeling that the region offered her little opportunity. She did not consider marriage to be a viable option, believing that matrimony should not be a woman's goal. As a young adult, she worked for her father in his law office. Her debut took place at this time, which she enjoyed despite considering her social obligations to be frivolous. Herron lamented her lack of career options as a woman, eventually taking up teaching as it was the only available career for which she was qualified. She taught French at a private school in Walnut Hills, Ohio for two years beginning in 1881, but she found it unpleasant. She wished to write or perform music, though neither developed into a career for her.

Herron first met William Howard Taft at a sledding party in 1880, though the Herron family and the Taft family were familiar with one another. They would go on to perform together as part of the community theater company. In 1884, Herron founded a salon to discuss intellectual topics each Sunday afternoon with other people of her age. Among the people she invited were Taft and his brother Horace. Taft courted Herron, accompanying her to dances and sending her letters and flowers. Self-doubt caused Herron to avoid commitment to Taft, fearing that he did not truly care for her or value her opinions. Taft proposed to her multiple times, and she eventually accepted in June 1885, though she asked that he keep the engagement secret.

== Marriage and family ==
=== Marriage ===
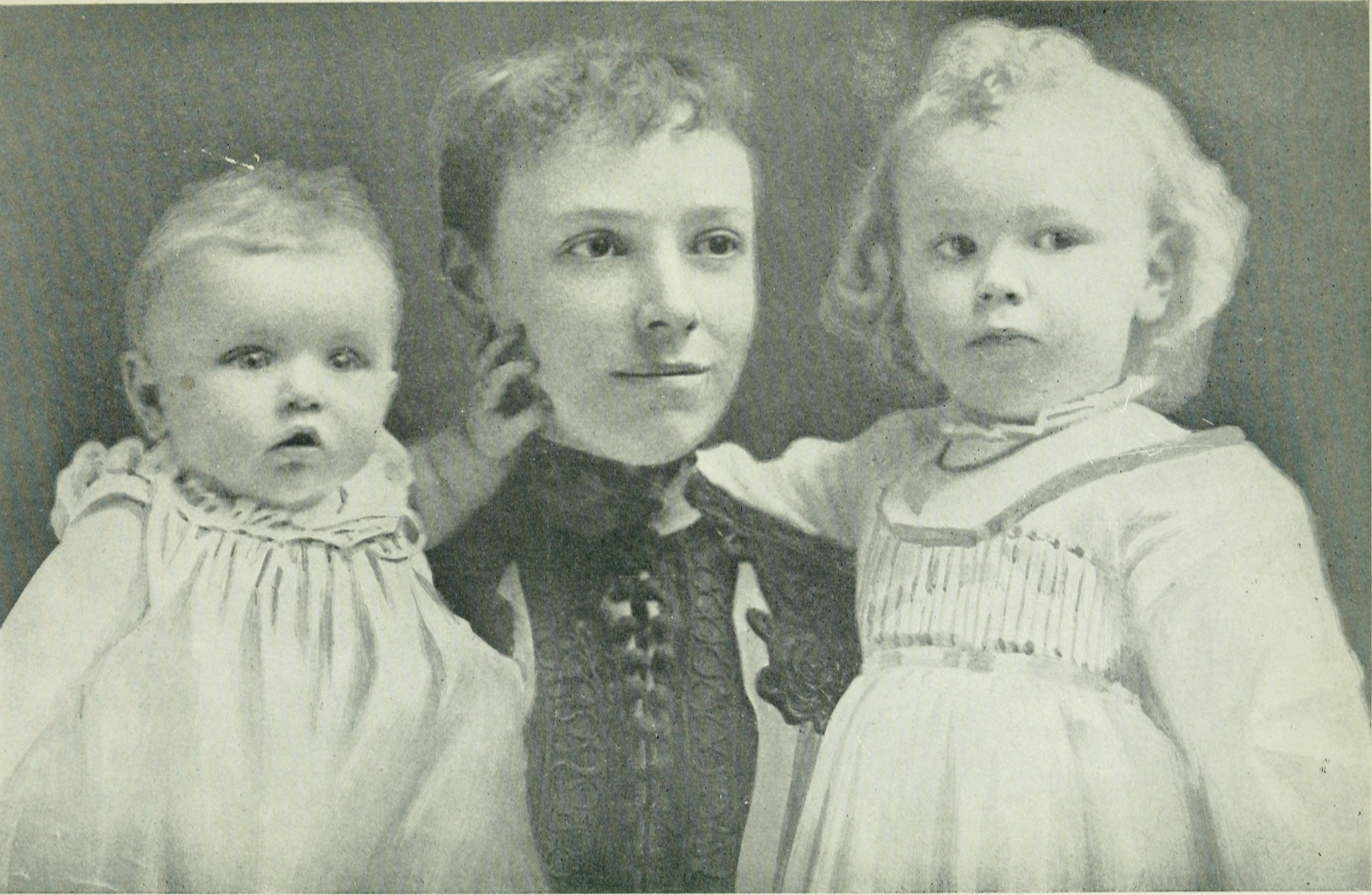
Helen Taft with her two elder children (1892)

Herron married Taft on June 19, 1886. They went on a honeymoon in Europe, spending three months in England before visiting Germany and Italy. She managed the budget on their vacation, limiting their spending to five dollars per day. After returning, her husband borrowed money to have a home built for them in Walnut Hills, and they lived with his parents until it was complete.

As a couple, they shared not only an emotional companionship but an intellectual one, and they held high regard for each other's ideas. Her husband would welcome her opinion when she thought he was in error, describing her as his "best critic", and she would sometimes mother him. He generally took her advice, though she failed in her attempts to convince him to live a healthier lifestyle and better control his weight. Taft's husband considered Taft to be the politician of the family, and early in their marriage he expected her to develop a political career that would outpace his own. She managed the finances of the Taft household, and she encouraged her husband's political career, pushing him toward the executive branch rather than his preferred career in the judiciary.

Taft worried about their political future when her husband accepted a five-year term on the Cincinnati Superior Court in 1888, but she was optimistic after he was appointed Solicitor General of the United States in 1890, a position which she had helped him in obtaining through her acquaintance with President Harrison. She saw their move to Washington, D.C., as an opportunity to escape Cincinnati, where she had felt confined, and she hoped that her husband would build connections in Washington politics. She assisted her husband in his presentation in this role, instructing him in oration to better plead cases. She also became a popular socialite in the city and regularly attended Congressional proceedings, both of which allowed her to build political connections. Among her closest friends in Washington were the family of Attorney General William H. H. Miller and the wives of the Supreme Court justices.

They returned to Cincinnati in 1892 when Taft's husband was appointed as a judge on the federal circuit. He enjoyed this position, but Taft again feared that it would stifle his ambition and that he would progress no further. While her husband served on the bench, Taft raised their three children: Robert, born 1889; Helen, born 1891; and Charles, born 1897. She helped found a hospital at this time, and she founded the Cincinnati Orchestra Association, serving as its president. She lamented the lack of excitement in Cincinnati, with her only respite being a vacation home in Murray Bay, Quebec.

=== Life in the Philippines ===
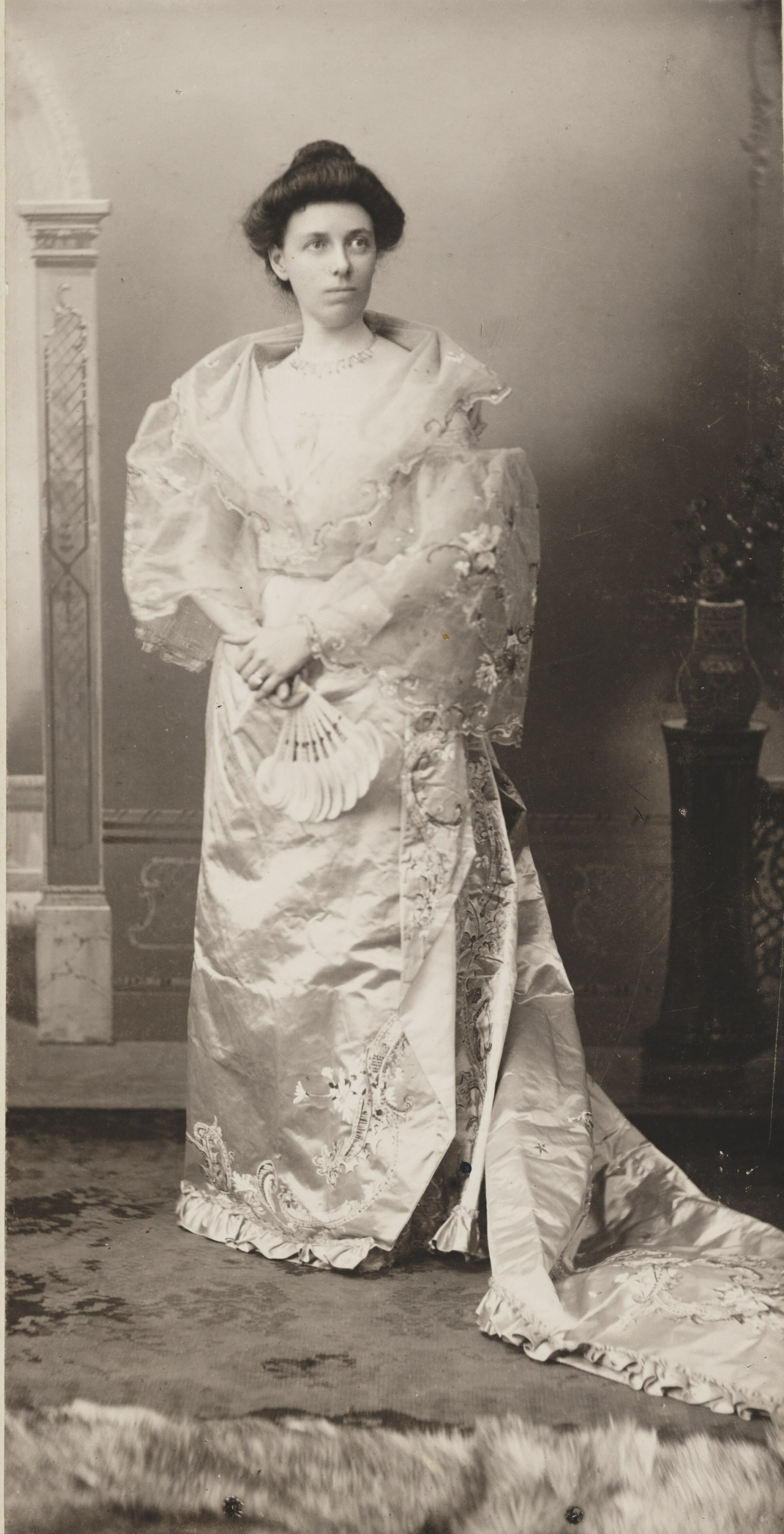
Helen Taft wearing a Philippine gown in Manila (1901)

Taft's husband was sent to help establish a government in the Philippines in 1900, as Spain had transferred the Philippines to the United States the previous year. Though neither of them knew what the job would entail, Taft encouraged him to accept the position. She relished this opportunity for travel and excitement, stopping in Hawaii and Japan while her husband went on to the Philippines. She also believed that the position would move him closer to the presidency. After Taft arrived in the Philippines, she sought to win the approval of the Filipino people and respect the culture of the Philippines by learning the language, wearing a native Filipino costume, and inviting Filipinos to social events. Taft's treatment of the Filipino people contributed to improved relations with the country, including her work to end the system of racial segregation that had previously been in place.

Taft traveled extensively throughout the Philippines, learning how to ride a horse in order to do so. She also accompanied her husband when he traveled to China, Japan, and Hong Kong on official duties. She considered her primary responsibility in the country to be the hosting of gala events, where she would mingle with the Filipino people. Her husband became Governor-General of the Philippines on July 4, 1901, and the Tafts moved into the Malacañang Palace in Manila. While in the Philippines, Taft organized a nutritional program that provided milk for Filipino children. When she wrote her autobiography years later, the majority of her writing addressed her years in the Philippines, overshadowing even her time in the White House.

The Tafts took leave from the Philippines and began a voyage to return home on December 24, 1901. The winter was difficult for Taft, as she was exhausted from the constant stress of her role in the Philippines, compounded by her husband needing two surgeries, and both of her parents suffering from strokes, her mother's proving fatal. Taft accompanied her husband on a trip to Italy in 1902, where she was treated as a guest of honor and was personally received by Pope Leo XIII. She returned to the Philippines in September 1902. When President Theodore Roosevelt offered Taft's husband the position of Secretary of War in 1904, she convinced him to accept, and they returned to Washington, D.C.

=== Cabinet member's wife ===
Taft became a cabinet member's wife when her husband became Secretary of War. In this role, she was expected to call upon and receive other cabinet members' wives in Washington. She considered the position to be a downgrade from her time in the Philippines, where she had grown accustomed to being the wife of the region's chief executive. This also required her to be in regular contact with first lady Edith Roosevelt, with whom she developed a strong rivalry. At the same time, Taft's husband developed a close political and personal friendship with President Roosevelt: a relationship that Taft encouraged and helped facilitate. His work in the Department of War did allow for more travel, providing Taft with a chance to learn more of international politics and make connections abroad. The couple traveled together to Panama and Japan, and she also took their children on a vacation to England while her husband stayed behind.

Taft's husband's career came to a crossroads in 1906 when President Roosevelt considered nominating him for a position on the Supreme Court, while at the same time momentum grew for a William Howard Taft presidency. Taft was vehemently opposed to her husband taking such a position, fearing it would end any further political aspirations. She personally met with Roosevelt and discouraged him from nominating her husband in a half hour discussion. Taft had spoken to the president on several occasions, earning his trust to improve her husband's position in the Roosevelt administration. This would eventually contribute to Roosevelt's support of a William Howard Taft presidency, and Roosevelt would even strategize politically with Taft rather than with her husband as the 1908 presidential election approached.

By 1907, Taft's husband was considered to be a potential candidate for the presidency, and the Tafts traveled across the country on a speaking tour. Taft found the experience more intensive than she had expected, and she was deeply embarrassed by one incident in which she lost track of the week and she was seen playing cards with her husband on the Lord's Day. Afterward, they returned to the Philippines and took a trip to other countries. Upon returning to the United States, Taft declined to join her husband in campaigning. She did advise him during his campaign, however, and she closely followed news coverage of the race so that she would be aware of the criticisms against him. She also advised him as to how his decisions as Secretary of War would affect public opinion.

== First Lady of the United States ==
=== Entering the White House ===
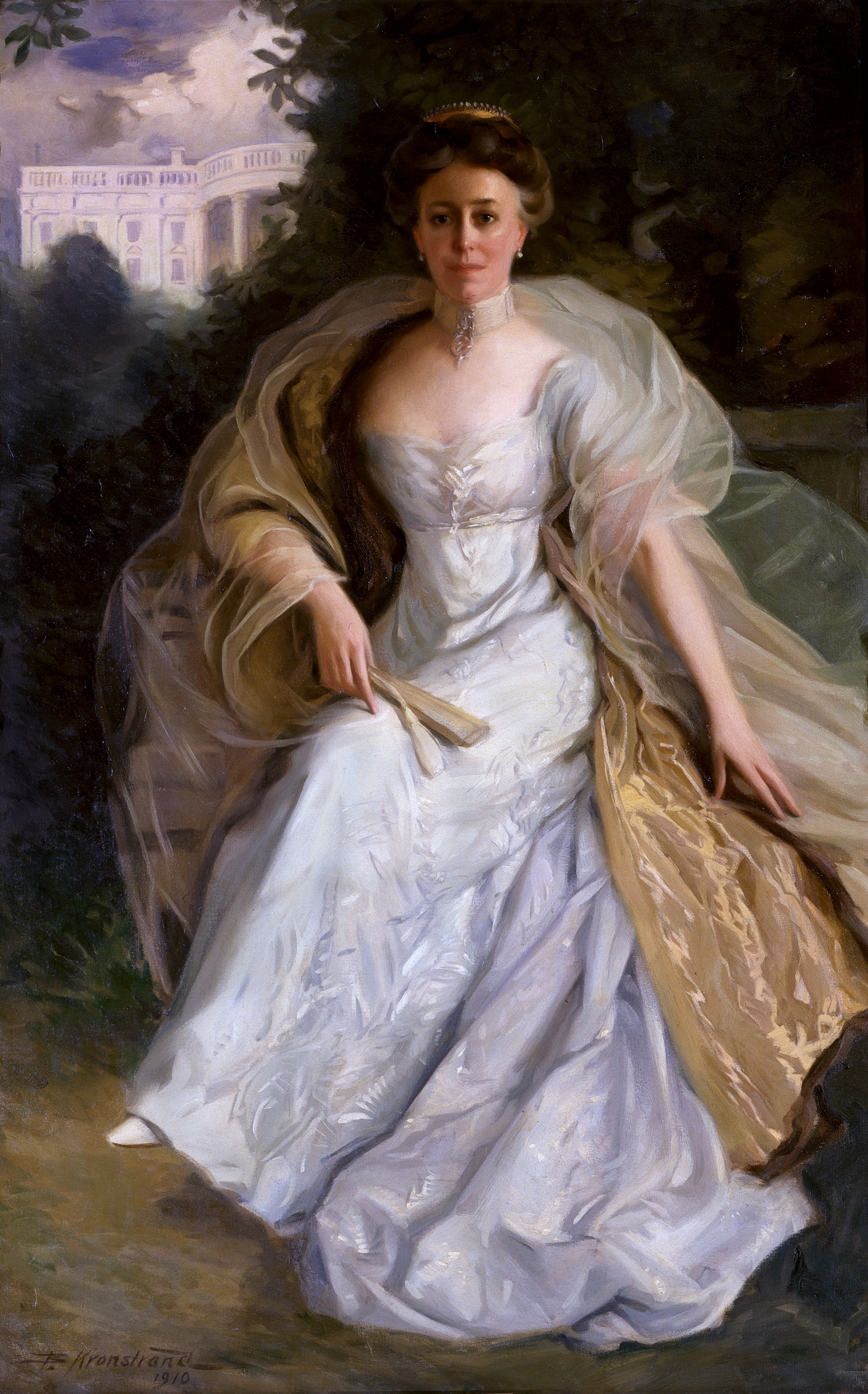
First Lady Helen Taft in her official White House portrait

Taft considered it a personal victory when her husband was elected president in 1908, as she had guided him toward the office. She eagerly planned for the upcoming inauguration and her term as first lady, including how she would manage the White House. She also had her inaugural dress sent to the Philippines so that it could be embroidered there. President Roosevelt was unavailable on the day of President Taft's inauguration [disputed - discuss], so Taft determined that she would ride to the White House with her husband in Roosevelt's place, becoming the first presidential wife to do so.

Upon entering the White House, Taft had the White House redecorated, and she removed the trophy heads that Theodore Roosevelt had mounted on the walls. She made several other decorative changes, taking inspiration from Eastern cultures and using flowers from the White House greenhouse. She had twin beds put into the White House for the first time, and she made accommodations for the White House silver collection by installing a vault and a silver cleaner. She also made staff changes, replacing the ushers with footmen and the steward with a housekeeper. Taft was strict about cleanliness and presentation in the White House, and her decorative talents were celebrated by contemporary journalists.

In May 1909, shortly after her husband's term began, Taft suffered a stroke, impairing her speech and limiting movement in right arm and leg. She left Washington to recover, causing newspapers to report that she had suffered a nervous breakdown. Over the following year, Taft was forced to relearn how to speak. She took a less active role after her stroke, but she remained involved in White House affairs. Though her condition improved over time, she would never fully recover. The nature of her stroke was not disclosed to the press, following a long-standing precedent of the press not inquiring about the first lady's private life.

=== Hostess and socialite ===
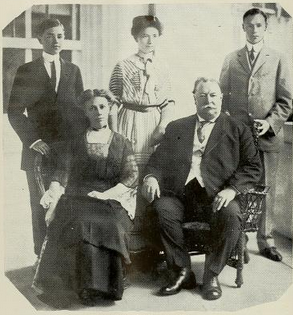
Taft family (1912)

Taft had grown accustomed to the royal style of treatment that she had experienced in the Philippines, and she wished to establish a similar regal environment as White House hostess. She sought to improve the social traditions associated with the White House while she was first lady; she changed the locations of events to make them more efficient, and she introduced dancing at formal receptions. She made extensive use of the White House lawn, hosting garden parties, theatrical shows, and music performances. In the time that she was recovering from her stroke in 1909, Taft took a less active role in organizing events, having her sisters and her daughter supporting her in the duties of White House hostess. She resumed her responsibilities in 1910, and she had returned to an active schedule by 1911. Taft hosted many parties and social events, but the social highlight of her tenure was the Tafts' silver wedding anniversary gala on June 19, 1911, for nearly 5,000 guests. Another 15,000 observers crowded outside of the White House.

Taft exerted some level of autonomy while she served as first lady. She declined to participate in luncheons with the wives of cabinet members, feeling that they were of little consequence and simply a means of putting her aside as a woman. Instead, she observed presidential meetings and closely managed the organization of the White House. She felt that the presidential salary of $75,000 was well above what they needed, she reduced their spending to $50,000 per year, accumulating a savings of $100,000 by the end of her husband's term. Among her cost-saving practices were the purchase of foods wholesale and the care of a cow on White House grounds to provide milk and butter. The presence of the cow was poorly received.

As first lady, Taft received guests three afternoons a week in the Red Room. She introduced musical entertainment after state dinners which became a White House tradition. The Tafts attended symphony, opera, and theater performances in Washington, D.C.; she started another summer tradition at West Potomac Park with the United States Marine Band playing for the public. One major undertaking of Taft's tenure as first lady was the transformation of the West Potomac Park into an esplanade. Inspired by Luneta Park in Manila, she had a bandstand constructed and organized weekly concerts. She also arranged for the planting of Japanese cherry trees, accepting a donation of trees from the mayor of Tokyo, who was a friend of the Tafts. The Potomac cherry trees would continue to be a popular tourist attraction, particularly during their blooming.

Prohibition was a major political issue while the Tafts lived in the White House. Taft opposed the Prohibition movement, and she served alcohol to White House guests against the wishes of the president. Unlike most other first ladies, Taft would visit the White House kitchens and oversee the preparation of food. In particular, she would observe the preparation of one of her specialty dishes, turtle soup. As first lady, Taft also saw to the replacement of horse and buggy with the first presidential automobile fleet. She was open with the press, and she broke precedent by actively participating in media interviews. She particularly engaged with women journalists to support their work and earn their support. In 1912, she donated her inauguration gown to the National Museum of American History to begin the First Ladies' Gown display, one of the Smithsonian’s most popular exhibits.

=== Political influence ===
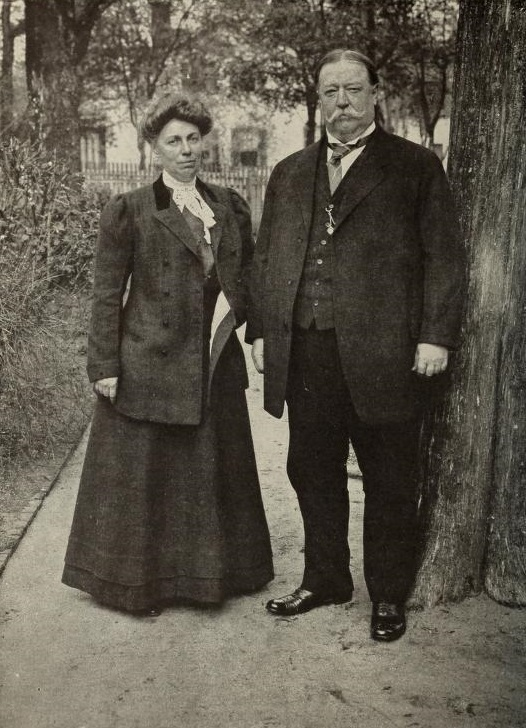
Helen and William Taft (1912)

Taft took an interest in everything relating to her husband's presidency, and she maintained her own opinions on important matters. Though she did not believe that women should be "meddling" in politics, she spoke publicly on her beliefs, even when they contradicted the positions of her husband. She managed his appearance and scheduling to ensure he maintained proper presentation, and she would provide him with political information such as names and statistics as he needed them. She would also stay near him to prevent his narcolepsy from affecting his responsibilities.

Taft also influenced appointments during her husband's presidency, providing her thoughts on the character of his nominees. She convinced her husband to recall ambassador Henry White because of a long-standing grudge that she held against him. She also rejected the appointment of Nicholas Longworth as a diplomat because he was married to Alice Roosevelt Longworth, whom she disliked. This latter action is cited as one of the reasons that Presidents Roosevelt and Taft began to oppose one another during the Taft presidency.

Though Taft did not identify as a feminist, she supported women's rights and used her position to advance the cause, convincing her husband to appoint women in government. In 1912, she attended a House Rules committee inquiry to hear testimonies of police brutality against women, bringing awareness to the issue. She also supported the rights of African Americans and other marginalized groups, believing that they were hampered by a lack of opportunity. She was active in other causes, such as safe workplace conditions, throughout her tenure as first lady. Her stroke at the beginning of her tenure prevented her from further political activity, a fact that she regretted. Her husband recognized her influence in White House politics, considering the accomplishments of his presidency to be hers as well. She also spoke openly about her own influence on the presidency, prompting criticism from her husband's political opponents.

Taft was the first first lady to visit the American judiciary. In 1911, she visited the Supreme Court of the United States to hear the arguments of Standard Oil Co. of New Jersey v. United States. She also asked to observe the inauguration of new Supreme Court justices, becoming the first woman to ever sit in the bar of the court. In June 1912, she attended both the Republican National Convention that re-nominated her husband and the Democratic National Convention that nominated his opponent Woodrow Wilson. She took a front-row seat at the latter in order to deter speakers' criticism of her husband. Though her husband disliked the presidency, Taft was saddened when her husband lost reelection to Woodrow Wilson in the 1912 presidential election, and she left the White House reluctantly.

== Later life and death ==
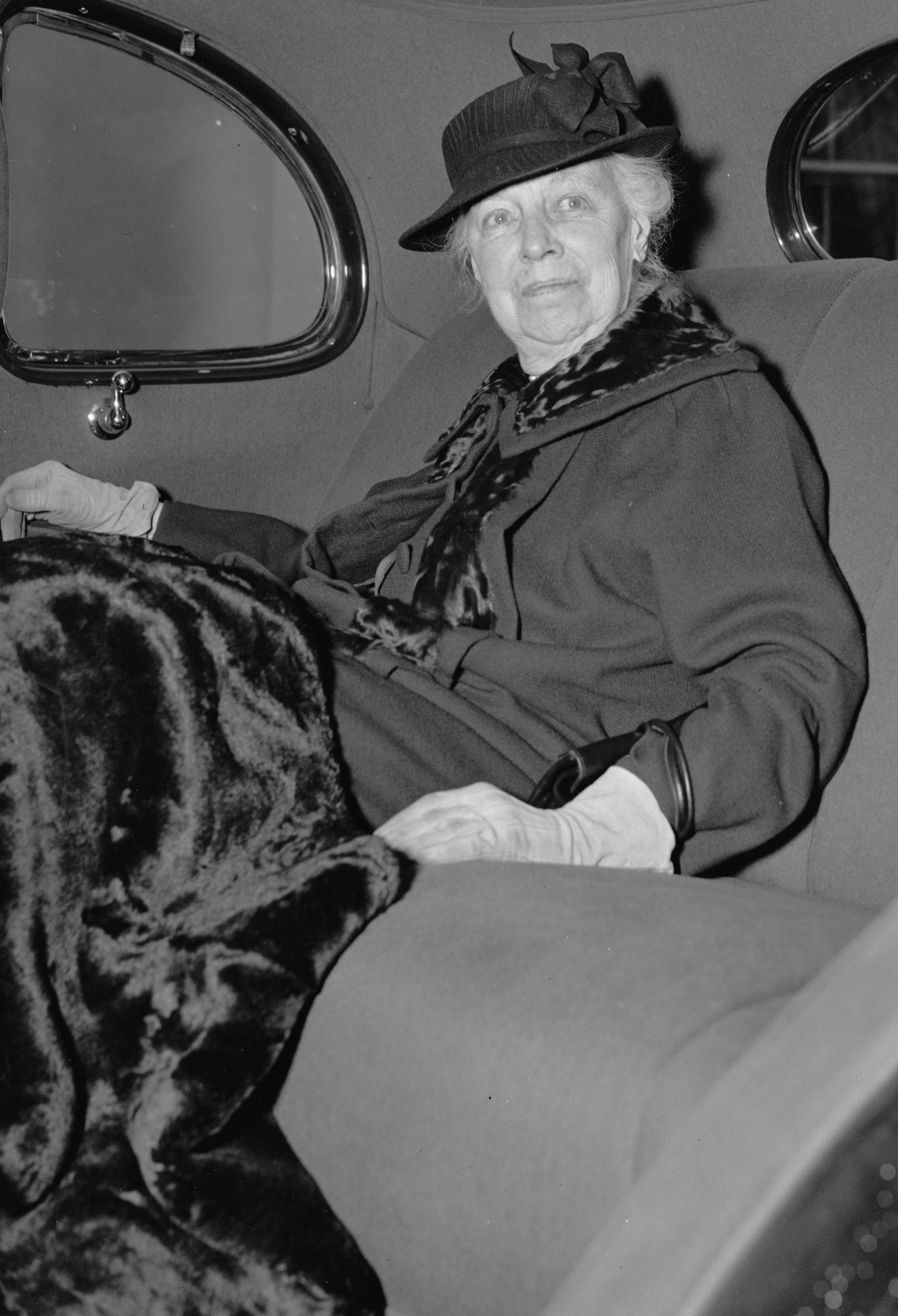
Helen Taft on December 6, 1938

After leaving the White House, the Tafts moved to New Haven, Connecticut, where Taft's husband held a chair at Yale University. Taft was unhappy with life outside of the White House, and she was often alone when her husband was traveling and her children were away at school. She was, however, happy to be out of the public eye. In 1914, Taft became the first first lady to publish a memoir with the publication of Recollections of Full Years, which had been written with her daughter Helen and journalist Eleanor Egan. She took an interest in the events of World War I, and during the war she provided support for the American Red Cross.

The Tafts continued to travel after retiring from the White House, visiting Bermuda, Panama, England, and Italy, being greeted in the latter two countries by King George V and the Pope, respectively. Continuing in her interest in politics, Taft joined the Colonial Dames of America in 1923 and became its honorary vice president in 1925.She also served as the honorary leader of the Girl Scouts of the USA.

After her husband's death in March 1930, she lived with her housekeeper in Washington, D.C., occasionally traveling to other countries. She continued to follow politics later in life, opposing the New Deal policies that were implemented in the 1930s. Taft died in Washington on May 22, 1943, and was buried next to her husband at Arlington National Cemetery.

== Legacy ==
Taft was one of the earliest first ladies to become directly involved in the political career of her husband. Her influence in presidential politics was not given significant attention by historians after her death in 1943, and like other first ladies, her influence was not closely examined by historians until the 1980s. Before this, she was most well known for her introduction of cherry trees in the West Potomac Park. The first biography about Taft was written in 2005 by Carl Sferrazza Anthony, who argued that she was her husband's closest advisor and that she saw herself as responsible for the presidency as her husband. Her role as a mentor and guide to her husband was recognized by contemporary journalists and has since become a defining aspect of her legacy. She is recognized for her role in developing her husband's political career and bringing about the presidency of William Howard Taft.

Honorary titles
Preceded by Edith Roosevelt	First Lady of the United States; 1909–1913	Succeeded by Ellen Wilson
