= Edith Wilson =

First Lady of the United States from 1915 to 1921

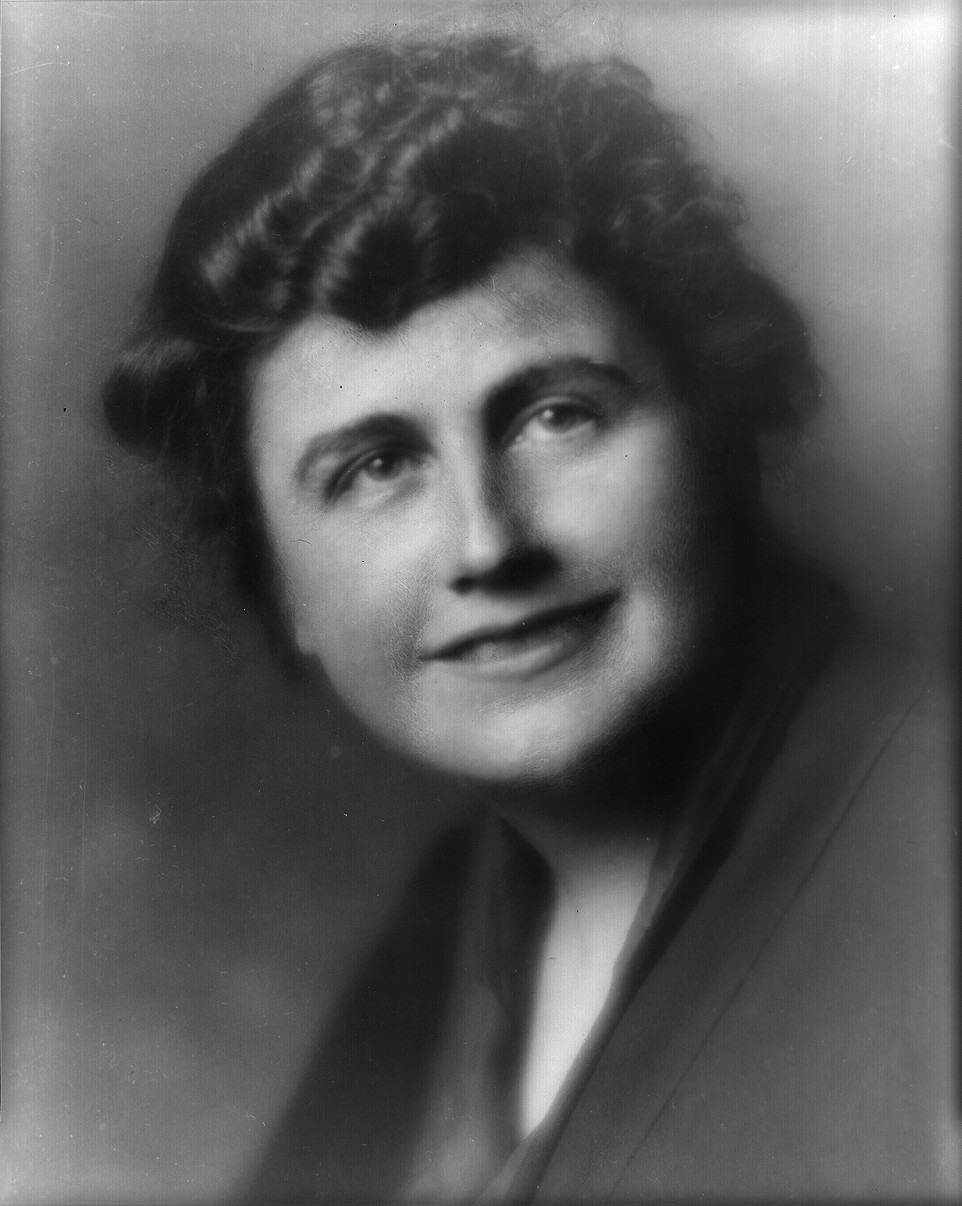
- Edith Wilson c. 1915

First Lady of the United States
- In role December 18, 1915 – March 4, 1921
- President: Woodrow Wilson
- Preceded by: Margaret Woodrow Wilson
- Succeeded by: Florence Harding

Personal details
- Born: Edith Bolling; October 15, 1872 Wytheville, Virginia, U.S.
- Died: December 28, 1961 (aged 89) Washington, D.C., U.S.
- Resting place: Washington National Cathedral
- Party: Democratic
- Spouses: Norman Galt (m. 1896; died 1908) Woodrow Wilson (m. 1915; died 1924)
- Children: 1

Edith Wilson (née Bolling, formerly Galt; October 15, 1872 – December 28, 1961) was First Lady of the United States from 1915 to 1921 as the second wife of President Woodrow Wilson. She married the widower Wilson in December 1915, during his first term as president. Edith Wilson played an influential role in President Wilson's administration following the severe stroke he suffered in October 1919. For the remainder of her husband's presidency, she managed the office of the president, a role she later described as a "stewardship", and determined which communications and matters of state were important enough to bring to the attention of the bedridden president.

== Early life ==
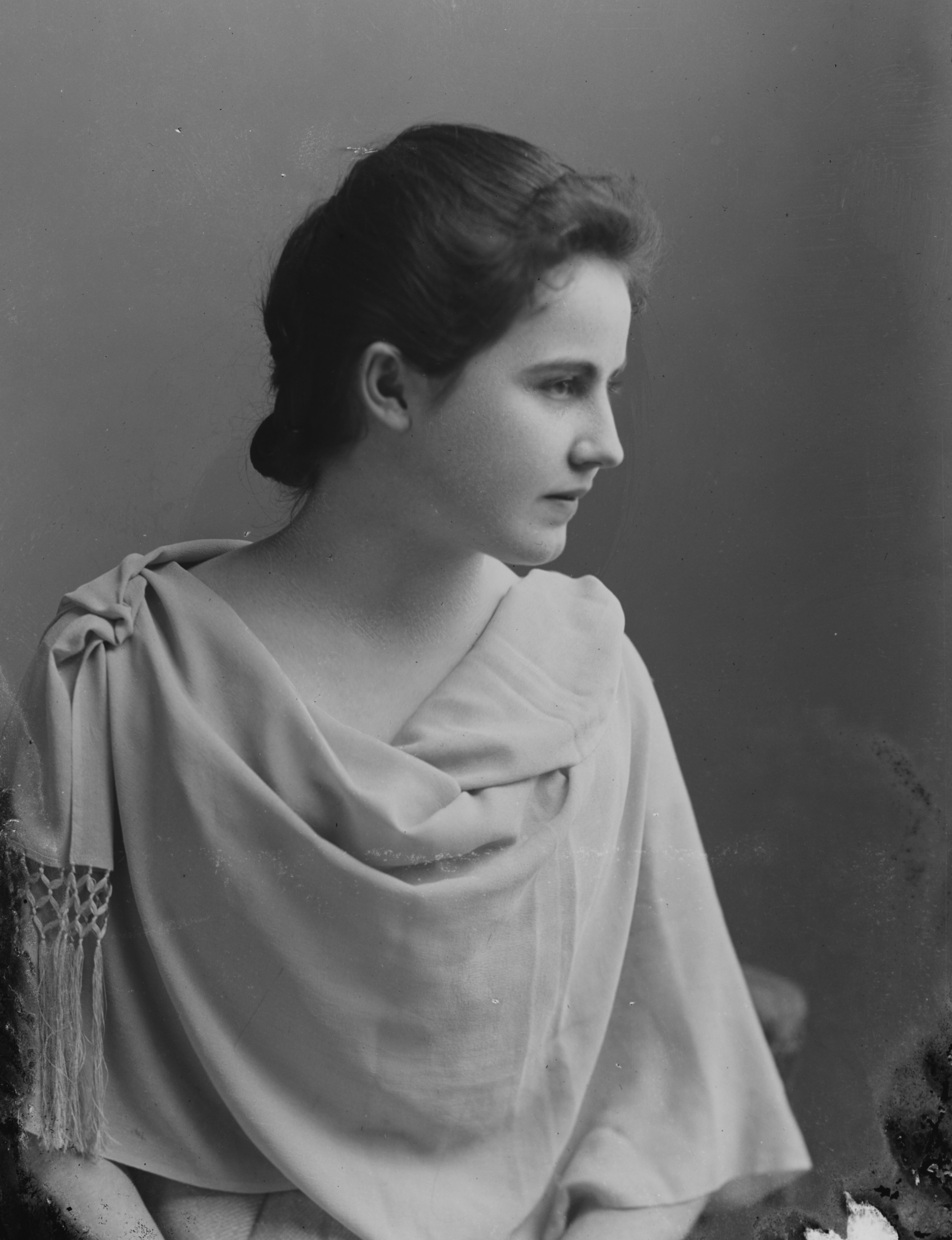
Edith Bolling in her youth

Edith Bolling was born October 15, 1872, in Wytheville, Virginia, to circuit court judge William Holcombe Bolling and his wife Sarah "Sallie" Spears (née White). Her birthplace, the Bolling Home, is now a museum located in Wytheville's Historic District.

Bolling was a descendant of the first settlers to arrive at the Virginia Colony. Through her father, she was also a descendant of Mataoka, better known as Pocahontas. Her father was descended from Pocahontas's granddaughter Jane Rolfe, who married Robert Bolling, a wealthy slave-owning planter and merchant. Additionally, she was related, either by blood or through marriage, to Thomas Jefferson, Martha Washington, Letitia Tyler, and the Harrison family.

Edith was the seventh of eleven children, two of whom died in infancy. The Bollings were some of the oldest members of Virginia's slave-owning, planter elite prior to the American Civil War. After the war ended and slavery was abolished, Edith's father turned to the practice of law to support his family. Unable to pay taxes on his extensive properties, and forced to give up the family's plantation seat, William Holcombe Bolling moved to Wytheville, where most of his children were born.

The Bolling household was a large one, and Edith grew up within the confines of a sprawling, extended family. In addition to eight surviving siblings, Edith's grandmothers, aunts and cousins also lived in the Bolling household. Many of the women in Edith's family lost husbands during the war. The Bollings had been staunch supporters of the Confederate States of America, were proud of their Southern planter heritage, and in early childhood, taught Edith in the post‑Civil War South's narrative of the Lost Cause. As was often the case among the planter elite, the Bollings justified slave ownership, saying that the slaves that they owned had been content with their lives as slaves and had little desire for freedom.

== Education ==
Edith had little formal education. While her sisters were enrolled in local schools, she was taught how to read and write at home. Their paternal grandmother, Anne Wiggington Bolling, played a large role in her education. Crippled by a spinal cord injury, Grandmother Bolling was confined to bed. Edith had the responsibility to wash her clothing, turn her in bed at night, and look after her 26 canaries.

In turn, Grandmother Bolling oversaw Edith's education, teaching her reading, writing, basic math skills, speaking a hybrid language of French and English, and making dresses. She also instilled in Edith a tendency to make quick judgments and hold strong opinions, personality traits Edith would exhibit her entire life. William Bolling read classic English literature aloud to his family at night, hired a tutor to teach Edith, and sometimes took her on his travels. The Bolling family attended church regularly, and Edith became a lifelong, practicing Episcopalian.

When Edith was 15, her father enrolled her at Martha Washington College, a finishing school for girls in Abingdon, Virginia. William Holcombe Bolling chose it for its excellent music program. Edith proved to be an undisciplined, ill-prepared student. She was miserable there, complaining of the school's austerity: the food was poorly prepared, the rooms too cold, and the daily curriculum excessively rigorous, intimidating, and too strictly regimented. Edith left after only one semester. Two years later, Edith's father enrolled her in Powell's School for Girls in Richmond, Virginia. Years later, Edith noted that her time at Powell's was the happiest time of her life. Unfortunately for Edith, the school closed at the end of the year after the headmaster suffered an accident that cost him his leg. Concerned about the cost of Edith's education, William Bolling refused to pay for any additional schooling, choosing instead to focus on educating her three brothers.

== First marriage ==
While visiting her married sister in Washington, D.C., Edith met Norman Galt (1864–1908), a prominent jeweler of Galt & Bro. The couple married on April 30, 1896, and lived in the capital for the next 12 years. In 1903, she bore a son who lived only for a few days. The difficult birth left her unable to have more children. In January 1908, Norman Galt died unexpectedly at the age of 43. Edith hired a manager to oversee his business, paid off his debts, and with the income left to her by her late husband, toured Europe.

== First Lady of the United States ==
=== Marriage to Woodrow Wilson ===
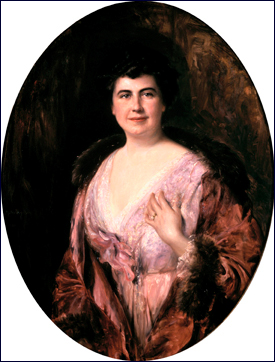
Wilson's official White House portrait

In March 1915, the widow Galt was introduced to recently widowed U.S. President Woodrow Wilson at the White House by Helen Woodrow Bones (1874–1951). Bones was the president's first cousin and served as the official White House hostess after the death of Wilson's wife, Ellen Wilson. Wilson took an instant liking to Galt and proposed soon after meeting her. However, the couple were troubled by rumors that Wilson had cheated on his wife with Galt and even that Wilson and Galt had murdered the First Lady. Distressed at the effect such wild speculation could have on respect for the presidency and on his personal reputation, Wilson suggested that Edith Bolling Galt back out of their engagement. Instead, she insisted on postponing the wedding until the end of the official year of mourning for Ellen Axson Wilson.

Wilson married Galt on December 18, 1915, at her home in Washington, D.C. There were 40 guests. The groom's pastor, Reverend Dr. James H. Taylor of Central Presbyterian Church, and the bride's, Reverend Dr. Herbert Scott Smith of St. Margaret's Episcopal Church, Washington, D.C., officiated jointly at the ceremony.

=== Early role as First Lady ===
As First Lady during World War I, Edith Bolling Wilson had relatively few opportunities to be a social hostess, especially after the United States' entry into the war in April 1917. In wartime, she observed gasless Sundays, meatless Mondays, and wheatless Wednesdays to set an example for the federal rationing effort. Similarly, she set sheep to graze on the White House lawn rather than use manpower to mow it, and had their wool auctioned off for the benefit of the American Red Cross. Additionally, Edith Wilson became the first First Lady to travel to Europe during her term. She visited Europe with her husband on two separate occasions, in 1918 and 1919, to visit troops and to sign the Treaty of Versailles. During this time, her presence amongst the female royalty of Europe helped to cement America's status as a world power and propelled the position of First Lady to an equivalent standing in international politics. Meanwhile, Woodrow Wilson's health was failing under the stress of the presidency, and she devoted much effort to trying to keep him fit.

=== Increased role after husband's stroke ===
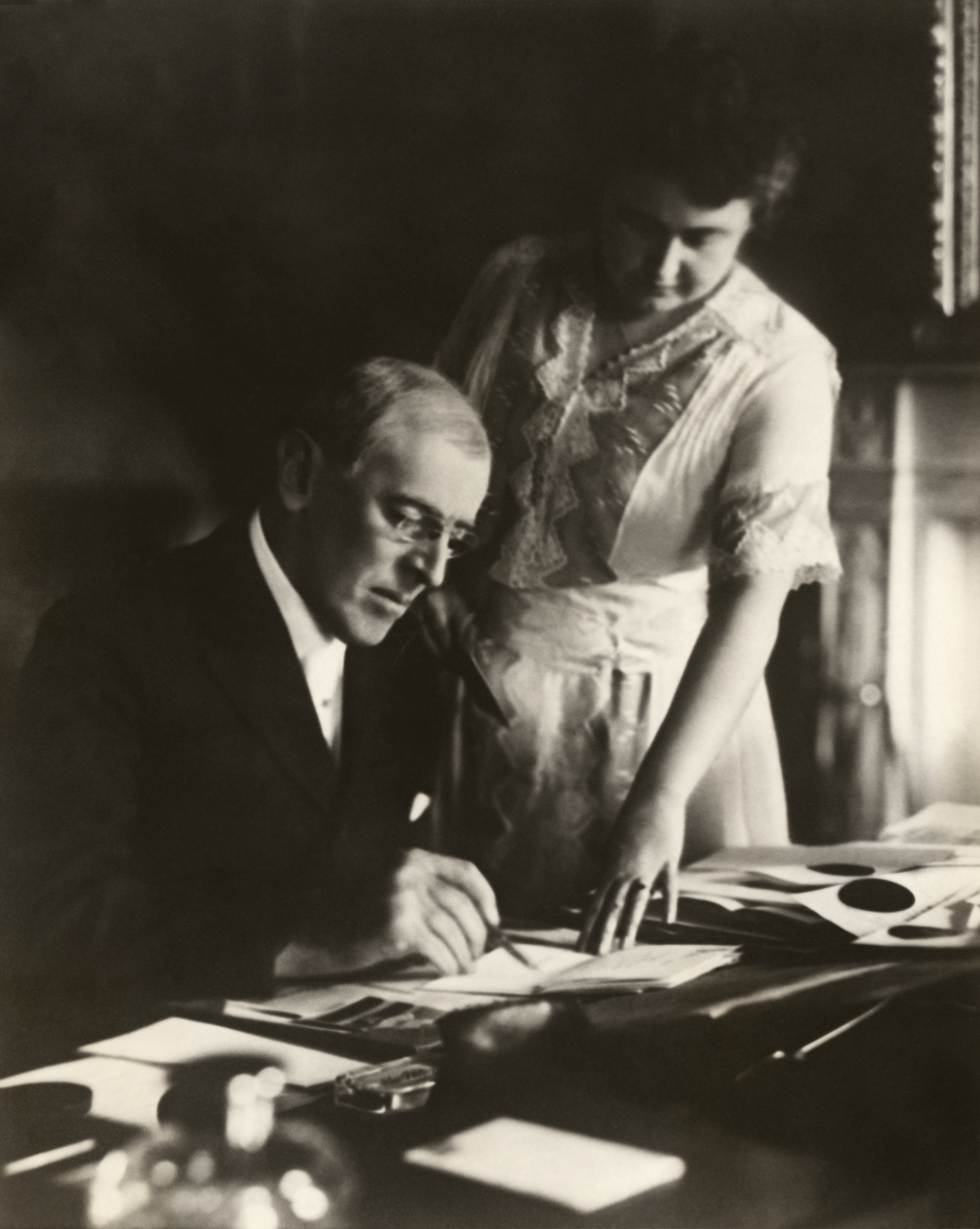
Woodrow Wilson's first posed photograph after his stroke. He was paralyzed on his left side, so Edith holds a document steady while he signs. June 1920.

Following his attendance at the Paris Peace Conference in 1919, Woodrow Wilson returned to the United States to campaign against strong non-interventionist sentiment for the ratification of the peace treaty and of the League of Nations Covenant. However, in October he suffered a stroke that left him bedridden and partially paralyzed.

Edith Wilson and others in the President's inner circle (including his physician and a few close friends) hid the true extent of the president's illness and disability from the American public. Edith also took over a number of routine duties and details of the executive branch of the government from the onset of Wilson's illness until he left office almost a year and a half later. From October 1919 to the end of Wilson's term on March 4, 1921, Edith, acting in a role she later described as a "stewardship", decided who and which communications and matters of state were important enough to bring to the bedridden president. Edith Wilson later wrote:

I studied every paper sent from the different Secretaries or Senators and tried to digest and present in tabloid form the things that, despite my vigilance, had to go to the President. I, myself, never made a single decision regarding the disposition of public affairs. The only decision that was mine was what was important and what was not, and the very important decision of when to present matters to my husband.

Edith became the sole communication link between the President and his Cabinet. She required they send her all pressing matters, memos, correspondence, questions, and requests.

Edith took her role very seriously, even successfully pushing for the removal of Secretary of State Robert Lansing after he conducted a series of Cabinet meetings without the President (or Edith herself) present. She also refused to allow the British ambassador, Edward Grey, an opportunity to present his credentials to the president unless Grey dismissed an aide who was known to have made demeaning comments about her. She assisted President Wilson in filling out paperwork, and would often add new notes or suggestions. She was made privy to classified information, and was entrusted with the responsibility of encoding and decoding encrypted messages.

==== Analysis and criticism of role ====
In My Memoir, published in 1939, Edith Wilson justified her self-proclaimed role of presidential "steward", arguing that her actions on behalf of Woodrow Wilson's presidency were sanctioned by Wilson's doctors; that they told her to do so for her husband's mental health. Edith Wilson maintained that she was simply a vessel of information for President Wilson; however, others in the White House did not trust her. Some believed that the marriage between Edith and Woodrow was hasty and controversial. Others did not approve of the marriage because they believed that Woodrow and Edith had begun communicating with each other while Woodrow was still married to Ellen Wilson.

In 1921, Joe Tumulty (Wilson's chief of staff) wrote: "No public man ever had a more devoted helpmate, and no wife a husband more dependent upon her sympathetic understanding of his problems ... Mrs. Wilson's strong physical constitution, combined with strength of character and purpose, has sustained her under a strain which must have wrecked most women." In subsequent decades, however, scholars were far more critical in their assessment of Edith Wilson's tenure as First Lady. Phyllis Lee Levin concluded that the effectiveness of Woodrow Wilson's policies was unnecessarily hampered by his wife, "a woman of narrow views and formidable determination". Judith Weaver opined that Edith Wilson underestimated her own role in Wilson's presidency. While she may not have made critical decisions, she did influence both domestic and international policy given her role as presidential gatekeeper. Howard Markel, a medical historian, has taken issue with Edith Wilson's claim of a benign "stewardship". Markel has opined that Edith Wilson "was, essentially, the nation's chief executive until her husband's second term concluded in March of 1921". While a widow of moderate education for her time, she nevertheless attempted to protect her husband and his legacy, if not the presidency, even if it meant exceeding her role as First Lady. This period of her life was dramatized in the 2021 historical fiction podcast Edith! starring Rosamund Pike.

== Later years ==
Upon leaving the White House in March 1921, Edith and Woodrow Wilson moved into a home on S Street NW in Washington, D.C. There she cared for the former president until his death on February 3, 1924. In subsequent years, she headed the Woman's National Democratic Club's board of governors when the club opened formally in 1924 and published her memoir in 1939.

On December 8, 1941, the day after Japan's attack on Pearl Harbor, President Franklin D. Roosevelt asked Congress to declare war, taking pains to draw a link with Wilson's April 1917 declaration of war. Edith Wilson was present during Roosevelt's address to Congress. On April 14, 1945, she attended Roosevelt's funeral at the White House. She later attended the January 20, 1961 inauguration of President John F. Kennedy.

Edith Wilson died of congestive heart failure on December 28, 1961, at age 89. She was to have been the guest of honor that day at the dedication ceremony for the Woodrow Wilson Bridge across the Potomac River between Maryland and Virginia, on what would have been her husband's 105th birthday. She was buried next to her husband at the Washington National Cathedral.

== Legacy ==
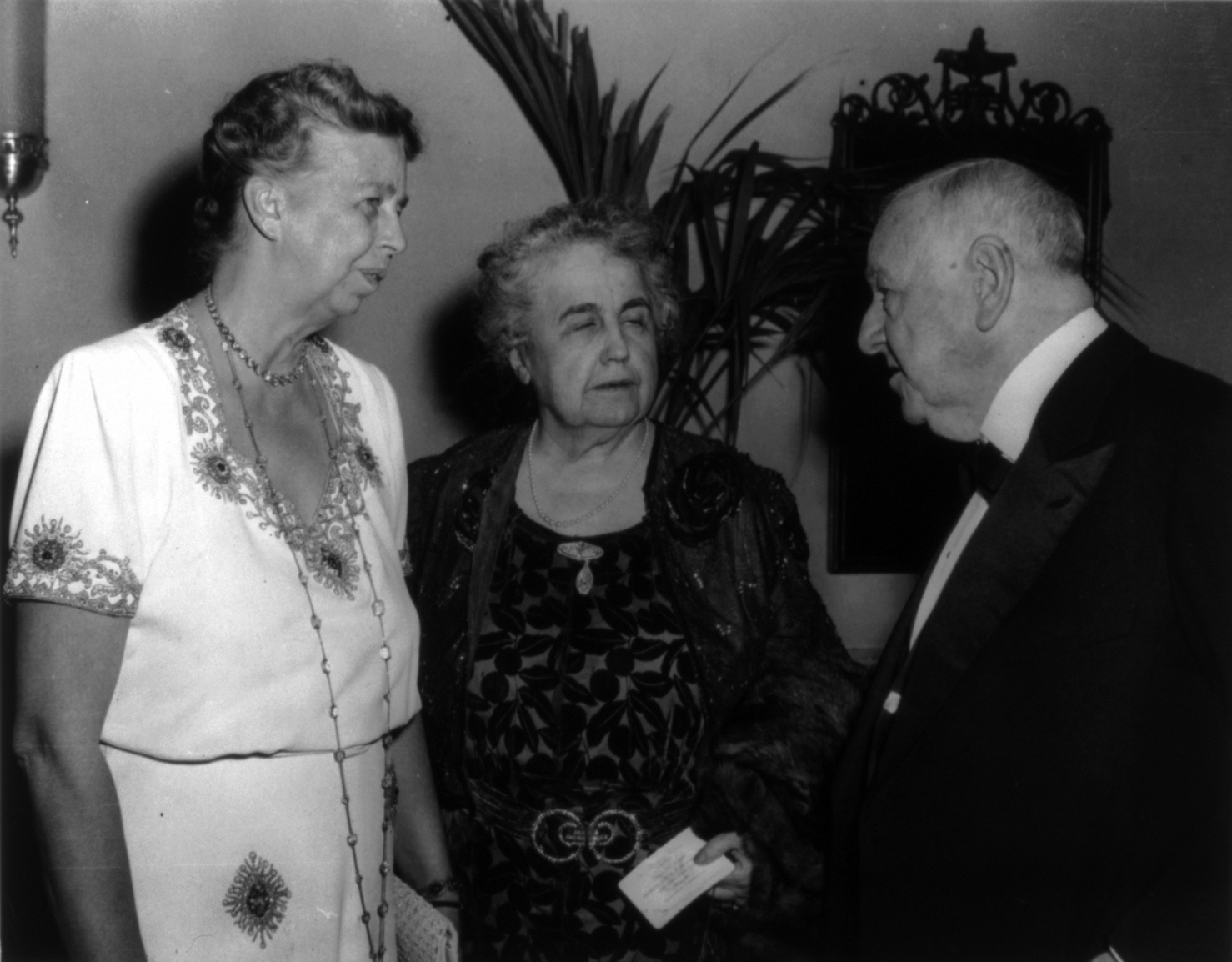
Edith Wilson with Eleanor Roosevelt in later life.

Wilson left her home to the National Trust for Historic Preservation, with a condition that it be made into a museum honoring her husband. The Woodrow Wilson House opened as a museum in 1964. To the Library of Congress, Mrs. Wilson donated first President Wilson's presidential papers in 1939, then his personal library in 1946.

The Edith Bolling Wilson Birthplace Foundation & Museum in Wytheville, Virginia was established in 2008. The foundation has stabilized the first lady's birthplace and childhood home; it had been identified in May 2013 by Preservation Virginia as an Endangered Historic Site. The foundation's programs and exhibits aspire to build public awareness "honoring Mrs. Wilson's name, the contributions she made to this country, the institution of the presidency, and for the example she sets for women." The Foundation shares First Lady Mrs. Wilson's journey "From Wytheville to The White House".

In 2015, a former historic bank building in Wytheville, located on Main Street, was dedicated to the First Lady and bears her name. Adapted as the Bolling Wilson Hotel, it serves Wytheville residents and travelers alike.

== Bibliography ==
- Caroli, Betty Boyd. First Ladies: From Martha Washington to Michelle Obama. Oxford, UK: Oxford University Press, 2010.
- Foster, Gaines. Ghosts of the Confederacy: Defeat, the Lost Cause, and the Emergence of the New South, 1865 to 1913. Oxford, UK: Oxford University Press, 1988.
- Gould, Lewis L. American First Ladies: Their Lives and Their Legacy. Florence, Ky.: Taylor and Francis, 2001.
- Hagood, Wesley O. Presidential Sex: From the Founding Fathers to Bill Clinton. Secaucus, N.J.: Carol Pub., 1998.
- Hatch, Alden. Edith Bolling Wilson. New York: Dodd, Mead, 1961.
- Hazelgrove, William Elliott. Madam President : The Secret Presidency of Edith Wilson. Washington, D.C.: Regency Publishing, 2016.
- Klapthor, Margaret Brown and Black, Allida M. The First Ladies. Washington, D.C.: White House Historical Association, 2001.
- Kupperman, Karen Ordahl. Indians & English: Facing Off in Early America. Ithaca, NY: Cornell University Press, 2000.
- Kupperman, Karen Ordahl. Settling with the Indians: the Meeting of English and Indian Cultures in America, 1580–1640. New York, NY: Rowman and Littlefield, 1980.
- Kupperman, Karen Ordahl. The Atlantic in World History. Oxford, UK: Oxford University Press, 2012.
- Kupperman, Karen Ordahl. The Jamestown Project. Cambridge, MA: Harvard University Press, 2007.
- Markel, Howard. "When a secret president ran the country," PBS News Hour (October 2, 2015)
- Miller, Kristie. Ellen and Edith: Woodrow Wilson's First Ladies. Lawrence, KS: University Press of Kansas, 2010.
- Lamb, Brian. Who's Buried in Grant's Tomb?: A Tour of Presidential Gravesites. New York: Public Affairs, 2010.
- Levin, Phyllis Lee. Edith and Woodrow: The Wilson White House. New York: Scribner, 2001. ISBN 0-7432-1158-8
- Maynard, W. Barksdale. Woodrow Wilson: Princeton to the Presidency. New Haven, Conn.: Yale University Press, 2008.
- Mayo, Edith. The Smithsonian Book of the First Ladies: Their Lives, Times, and Issues. New York: Henry Holt and Company, 1994.
- McCallops, James S. Edith Bolling Galt Wilson: The Unintended President. New York: Nova History Publications, 2003.
- Nordhult, J.W. Schulte. Woodrow Wilson: A Life for World Peace. Berkeley, Calif.: University of California Press, 1991.
- Phifer, Gregg. Speech Monographs, Vol. 38 Issue 4 (Nov 1971).
- Roberts, Rebecca Boggs. Untold Power: The Fascinating Rise and Complex Legacy of First Lady Edith Wilson (2023), scholarly biography excerpt
- Robertson, Wyndham. Pocahontas: Alias Matoaka, and Her Descendants through Her Marriage at Jamestown, Virginia, in April 1614, with John Rolph, Gentleman. Richmond, VA: J W Randolph & English, 1887.
- Schneider, Dorothy and Schneider, Carl J. First Ladies: A Biographical Dictionary. New York: Facts On File, 2010.
- Townshend, Camilla. Pocahontas and the Powhatan Dilemma. New York, NY: Hill and Wang, 2004.
- Waldrup, Carole Chandler. Wives of the American Presidents. Jefferson, N.C.: McFarland, 2006.
- Weaver, Judith L. "Edith Bolling, Wilson as First Lady: A Study in the Power of Personality, 1919–1920," Presidential Studies Quarterly 15, No. 1 (Winter, 1985), pp. 51–76
- Wertheimer, Molly Meijer. Inventing a Voice: The Rhetoric of American First Ladies of the Twentieth Century. Lanham, Md.: Rowman & Littlefield, 2004.

=== Primary sources ===
- Tribble, Edwin. ed. A President in Love : The Courtship Letters of Woodrow Wilson and Edith Bolling Galt. Boston, MA: Houghton Mifflin, 1981.
- Tumulty, Joseph Patrick. Woodrow Wilson as I Know Him. New York, NY:, Doubleday, Page & Co., 1921.
- Wilson, Edith Bolling Galt. My Memoir. New York: The Bobbs-Merrill Company, 1939.
- Young, Dwight and Johnson, Margaret. Dear First Lady: Letters to the White House: From the Collections of the Library of Congress & National Archives. Washington, D.C.: National Geographic, 2008.

Honorary titles
Preceded by Margaret Wilson; Acting	First Lady of the United States; 1915–1921	Succeeded by Florence Harding
