= Kendrick Clements =

American historian (born 1939)

- Born: Kendrick A. Clements; February 7, 1939 (age 87)
- Occupations: Historian, author, history professor

Academic background
- Education: Williams College (BA); University of California, Berkeley (MA, PhD)

Kendrick A. Clements (born February 7, 1939) is a retired history professor and author in South Carolina. He wrote books about U.S. president Woodrow Wilson, who spent some of his childhood in South Carolina, as well as papers and books on James F. Byrnes, William Jennings Bryan, and Herbert Hoover. He retired from the University of South Carolina in 2006 and has emeritus status at the school.

Clements received a B.A. from Williams College and an M.A. and Ph.D. from the University of California at Berkeley.

He was interviewed for the 1997 film Woodrow Wilson: Reluctant Warrior. He discussed one of his books on Wilson on C-SPAN April 16, 2013.

Clements wrote that Wilson, who segregated federal workers in the United States, "had none of the crude, vicious racism of James K. Vardaman or Benjamin R. Tillman, but he was insensitive to African-American feelings and aspirations." Clements wrote for a Princeton University website addressing Wilson's legacy and the university's buildings and programs named for Wilson.

A Kirkus Reviews writeup described one of his books on Wilson as "not very urgent or thought-provoking." His book on Herbert Hoover's environmental policies was described as exhaustive in a review. Nancy Unger gave the book a mostly favorable review.

== Bibliography ==
- James F. Byrnes and the Origins of the Cold War, editor (1982)
- William Jennings Bryan, Missionary Isolationist (1982)
- Woodrow Wilson, World Statesman (1987; revised ed. 1999; electronic ed. 2014)
- The Presidency of Woodrow Wilson (1992)
- Hoover, Conservation, and Consumerism: Engineering the Good Life (2000)
- The Life of Herbert Hoover: Imperfect Visionary, 1918-1928 (2010)
- Woodrow Wilson, co-authored with Eric A. Cheezum

== See also ==
- Dunning School
