= List of photographs of Woodrow Wilson =

This is a list of photographs of Woodrow Wilson from 1871 to 1924.

== 1871-1909 ==
Image	Date	Photographer	Location	Description
	1871	Wearn & Hix	Columbia, South Carolina	15-year-old Woodrow Wilson.
	1873	Wearn & Hix	Columbia, South Carolina	18-year-old Wilson.
	1875	Pach Brothers	New York City, New York	Woodrow Wilson as a young man in his early 20s.
	1876	G.W. Pach	Broadway, New York	Wilson in Broadway, New York.
	1878	Unknown	Princeton University, Princeton, New Jersey	Wilson (seated, third left) with the editorial board of the "Princetonian".
	1879	Unknown	Princeton University, Princeton, New Jersey	Wilson (third from the right) with members of the Alligator Eating Club.
	1881	Unknown	Atlanta, Georgia	25-year-old Woodrow Wilson.
	1895	Underwood and Underwood	Unknown	Wilson (Left most) with family members.
	1902	James E. Purdy	Princeton, New Jersey	Portrait of Woodrow Wilson while he was President of Princeton University.
	1902	Pirie MacDonald	Princeton, New Jersey	Portrait of Woodrow Wilson while he was President of Princeton University.
	1908-1910	G. Prince	New Jersey	Wilson during his campaign as Governor of New Jersey.

== 1910-1913 ==
Image	Date	Photographer	Location	Description
	1910	American Press Association	Princeton, New Jersey	Woodrow Wilson after being elected as Governor of New Jersey.
	1910	American Press Association	Princeton, New Jersey	Wilson with his wife Ellen Axson Wilson.
	1910	George Grantham Bain	Princeton, New Jersey	Woodrow Wilson after being elected as Governor of New Jersey.
	1910	George Grantham Bain	Unknown	Woodrow Wilson with several congressmen.
	1911	Pach Brothers	Pedricktown, New Jersey	Wilson with his wife and daughters.
	1911	Unknown	Pedricktown, New Jersey	Governor Wilson sitting at his desk.
	1911	Unknown	Pedricktown, New Jersey	Wilson in an automobile whilst campaigning for president.
	1912	Unknown		Wilson walking with one of his daughters.
	1912	Unknown		Wilson's portrait on a Czechoslovak postcard.
	1912	Samuel Perkins Gilmore	Unknown	A seating portrait of Wilson.
	1912	Underwood & Underwood	Bradford, Ohio	Wilson campaigning for president in Bradford, Ohio.
	August 1912	Unknown	New Jersey	Wilson with his wife and three daughters.
	August 7, 1912	George Grantham Bain	New Jersey	1. Sen. Ben Tillman, 2. John E. Osborne, 3. J.B. Sanford, 4. P.L. Hall, 5. Governor Wilson, 6. Norman Mack, 7. Willard Saulsbury, 8. J.E. Davies, 9. J.R. Mountcastle, 10. Cong. Talbott.
	November 8, 1912	Unknown	New Jersey	Governor Wilson at during campaign season.
	December 2, 1912	Pach Brothers	Washington, D.C.	Wilson sitting for a portrait photograph by the Pach Brothers.
	December 21, 1912	George Grantham Bain	Trenton, New Jersey	Wilson with William Jennings Bryan in Trenton, New Jersey.
	December 28, 1912	Unknown	Mary Baldwin College, Staunton Virginia	Wilson visiting Mary Baldwin College in late 1912.
	1913	National Photo Company	Unknown	Wilson wearing a top hat in 1913.
	March 4, 1913	Unknown	Washington, D.C.	Woodrow Wilson is sworn in to his first term as President of the United States by Chief Justice Edward Douglass White.
	March 4, 1913	Unknown	White House, Washington, D.C.	Wilson with outgoing president William Howard Taft.
	March 13, 1913	Unknown	Sea Girt, New Jersey	Wilson wearing a suit on horseback with U.S. soldiers at Camp Wilson.
	June 14, 1913	National Photo Company	Washington, D.C.	Wilson and some of his associates: William J. Bryan, Josephus Daniels, Breckinridge Long, William Phillips, and Franklin D. Roosevelt.
	July 4, 1913	George Grantham Bain	Gettysburg, Pennsylvania	Wilson with several Civil War veterans at the 1913 Gettysburg reunion.
	July 4, 1913	George Grantham Bain	Gettysburg, Pennsylvania	Wilson speaking under the Great Tent to Civil War veterans at the 1913 Gettysburg reunion.
	December 2, 1913	Harris & Ewing	Washington, D.C.	Woodrow Wilson delivering the 1913 State of the Union Address to the 63rd United States Congress.
	December 23, 1913	George Grantham Bain	Washington, D.C.	Wilson with his cabinet.

== 1914-1918 ==
Image	Date	Photographer	Location	Description
	1914	Harris & Ewing	Washington, D.C.	Wilson sitting for a portrait photograph by Harris & Ewing.
	May 11, 1914	George Grantham Bain	New York City, New York	Wilson with John Purroy Mitchel attending the memorial service for the 17 U. S. sailors who died at Vera Cruz.
	June 4, 1914	Harris & Ewing	Arlington National Cemetery, Arlington County, Virginia	Wilson speaking at the dedication ceremony for the Confederate Memorial in Arlington National Cemetery.
	June 13, 1914	George Grantham Bain	Princeton, New Jersey	Wilson in Princeton with a boater hat with the number "79".
	December 26, 1914	Unknown	United Kingdom	Wilson meeting Lord Mayor of Dover, accompanied by the Duke of Connaught.
	December 28, 1914	Unknown	Buckingham Palace, London, England	Woodrow Wilson with King George V of England outside Buckingham Palace.
	1915	Unknown		Wilson with Assistant Secretary of the Navy, Franklin D. Roosevelt.
	1915	Unknown	Unknown	Woodrow Wilson in mid-1915.
	October 9, 1915	George Grantham Bain	National League Park, Philadelphia, Pennsylvania	Woodrow Wilson throws out the ceremonial first pitch, first for a president in the 1915 World Series.
	November 27, 1915	Underwood & Underwood	Polo Grounds, New York City	Wilson wearing a top hat at the 1915 Navy Midshipmen football team.
	1916	Unknown	Princeton University, Princeton, New Jersey	Wilson smiling while wearing a cap.
	1916	Harris & Ewing	Washington, D.C.	Woodrow Wilson with his cabinet during his first term.
	April 12, 1916	National Photo Company	Griffith Stadium, Washington, D.C.	Wilson throws out the ceremonial first pitch on Opening Day of the baseball season.
	September 2, 1916	Keller & White	Long Branch, New Jersey	Wilson accepts the Democratic Party nomination for president in 1916.
	February 3, 1917	Harris & Ewing	Washington, D.C.	President Wilson before Congress, announcing the break in official relations with the German Empire.
	March 5, 1917	National Photo Company	Washington, D.C.	Woodrow Wilson is sworn in to his second term as President of the United States by Chief Justice Edward Douglass White.
	April 2, 1917	Unknown	Washington, D.C.	Wilson declaring announcing America's entry into World War I.
	May 1917	National Photo Company	Fort Myer, Virginia	Woodrow Wilson visiting Fort Myer to an exhibition drill for a charity.
	June 20, 1917	Harris & Ewing	Washington, D.C.	Wilson with William Howard Taft and several officers from the American Red Cross.
	February 1918	Unknown	Washington, D.C.	left to right; Robert W. DeForest, President Wilson, Ex.President William H. Taft, Eliot M. Wadsworth. Back row, left to right. Henry P. Davison, Grayson M. P. Murphy, Charles D. Norton, Edward N. Hurley
	December 26, 1918	United States Army Signal Corps	Dover, England	Wilson with his wife Received by Field Marshal H.r.h. Duke of Connaught on Arrival at Dover.

== 1919-1924 ==
Image	Date	Photographer	Location	Description
	1919	Harris & Ewing	Washington, D.C.	Wilson sitting for a portrait photograph by Harris & Ewing.
	January 17, 1919	U.S. War Department	Dover, England	Wilson listening to a speech prepared by Sir Archibald Bodkin.
	February 1919	Unknown	Unknown	Wilson with Assistant Secretary of the Navy Franklin D. Roosevelt, Edith Wilson and an unnamed Marine officer.
	May 27, 1919	Edward N. Jackson	Paris, France	Left to right: David Lloyd George, Vittorio Emanuele Orlando, Georges Clemenceau and Woodrow Wilson at the Paris Peace Conference.
	July 8, 1919	Unknown	New York Harbor, New York	Wilson returning to America aboard the USS George Washington following the Paris Peace Conferences.
	May 30, 1919	Unknown	Suresnes American Cemetery, France	Wilson with his wife on Decoration Day at the Suresnes American Cemetery and Memorial.
	September 17,	Unknown	San Francisco, California	President Wilson, with his chauffeur George Howard.
	December 28, 1919	Unknown	Dover, England	Wilson arrives in Dove; greeted by English schoolchildren strewing flowers at his feet.
	1920	Unknown		Portrait of T. Woodrow Wilson.
	June, 1920	Harris & Ewing	White House, Washington, D.C.	Wilson Wilson, seated at desk with his wife, Edith Bolling Galt, standing at his side.
	March 10, 1921	Unknown	Manchester, England	Wilson inspecting a group of guards in Manchester.
	March 10, 1921	Unknown	Dover, England	Wilson inspecting sailors in Dover before heading to France.
	August 3, 1923	Unknown	White House, Washington, D.C.	Wilson in an automobile outside the White House.
	August 8, 1923	Unknown	Washington, D.C.	An elderly Wilson en route to attend Warren G. Harding's funeral.
	November 11, 1923	Unknown	Washington, D.C.	Woodrow Wilson looking down at a crowd from a window.
	December 12, 1923	Unknown	Washington, D.C.	Wilson stops on his daily drive to purchase Tuberculosis Seals from Sylvia Suter, a little Health Crusader.
	December 18, 1923	Unknown	Washington, D.C.	Wilson with his daughter, Margaret Wilson in an automobile.
