= Woodrow Wilson =

President of the United States from 1913 to 1921

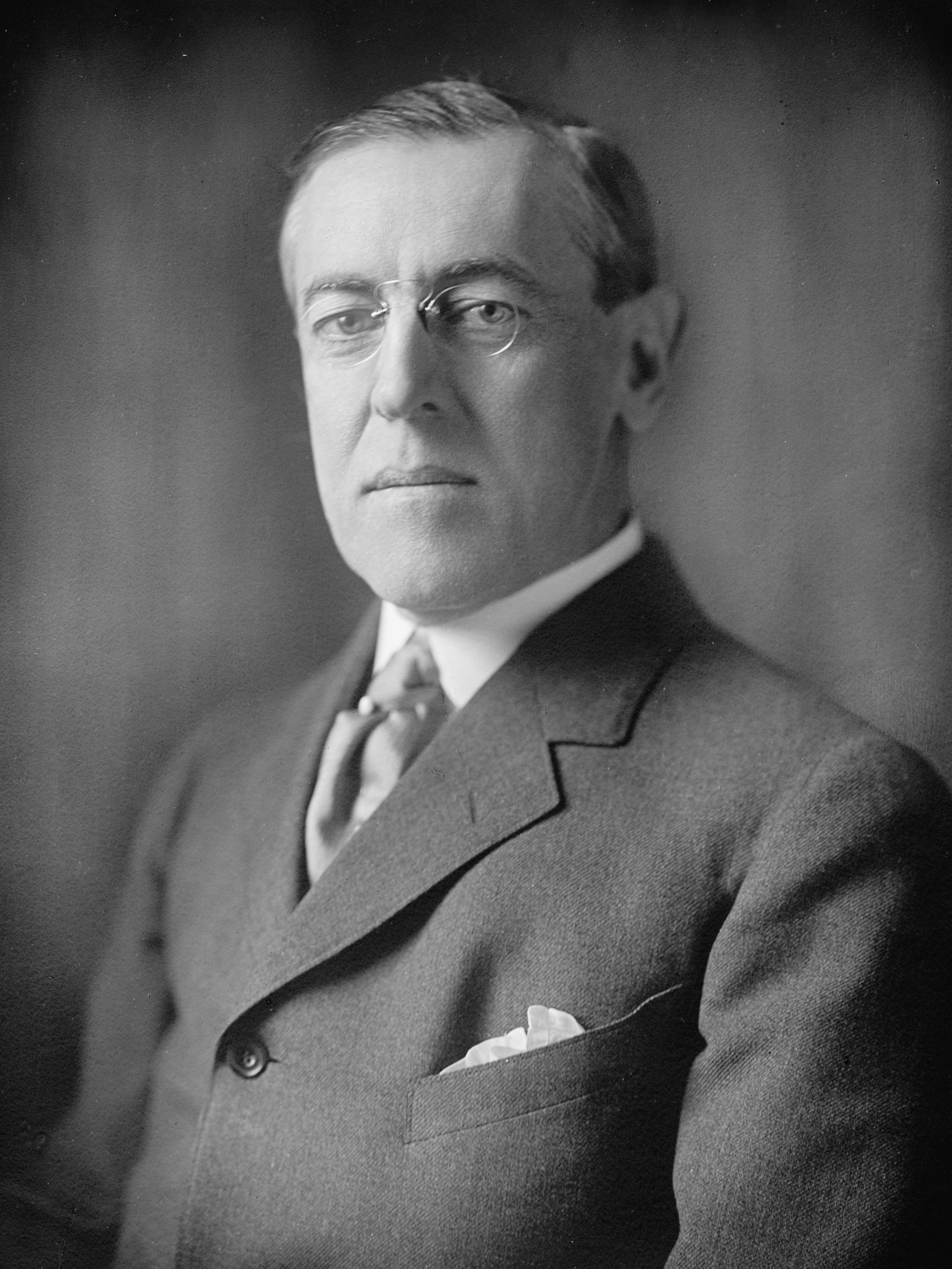
- Wilson, c. 1905–1924

28th President of the United States
- In office March 4, 1913 – March 4, 1921
- Vice President: Thomas R. Marshall
- Preceded by: William Howard Taft
- Succeeded by: Warren G. Harding

34th Governor of New Jersey
- In office January 17, 1911 – March 1, 1913
- Preceded by: John Franklin Fort
- Succeeded by: James Fairman Fielder

13th President of Princeton University
- In office October 25, 1902 – October 21, 1910
- Preceded by: Francis Landey Patton
- Succeeded by: John Grier Hibben

Personal details
- Born: Thomas Woodrow Wilson; December 28, 1856 Staunton, Virginia, U.S.
- Died: February 3, 1924 (aged 67) Washington, D.C., U.S.
- Resting place: Washington National Cathedral
- Party: Democratic
- Spouses: Ellen Axson (m. 1885; died 1914) Edith Bolling (m. 1915)
- Children: Margaret; Jessie; Eleanor
- Parent: Joseph Ruggles Wilson (father)
- Education: College of New Jersey (AB); Johns Hopkins University (PhD)
- Occupation: Politician; Academic; Lawyer
- Awards: Nobel Peace Prize (1919)
- Scientific career
- Fields: Political science
- Workplaces: Princeton University; Johns Hopkins University
- Thesis: Congressional Government: A Study in American Politics (1886)
- Wilson's voice Wilson speaks on democratic principles Recorded September 24, 1912

Thomas Woodrow Wilson (December 28, 1856 – February 3, 1924) was the 28th president of the United States, serving from 1913 to 1921. He was the only Democrat to serve as president during the Progressive Era, when Republicans dominated the presidency and legislative branches. As president, Wilson made significant economic reforms and led the United States through World War I. He was the leading architect of the League of Nations, and his stance on foreign policy came to be known as Wilsonian idealism.

Born in Staunton, Virginia, Wilson grew up in the Southern United States during the American Civil War and Reconstruction era. After earning a PhD in history and political science from Johns Hopkins University, Wilson taught at several colleges prior to being appointed president of Princeton University, where he emerged as a prominent spokesman for progressivism in higher education. Wilson is considered one of the founding fathers of the field of public administration due to his 1887 article "The Study of Administration". Wilson served as the governor of New Jersey from 1911 to 1913, during which he broke with party bosses and won the passage of several progressive reforms.

In the 1912 election, Wilson defeated the incumbent Republican president, William Howard Taft, and the third-party nominee and former president Theodore Roosevelt, becoming the first Southerner to win the presidency since Zachary Taylor in the 1848 election. During his first year as president, Wilson authorized the widespread imposition of racial segregation inside the federal bureaucracy, and his opposition to women's suffrage drew protests. His first term was largely devoted to pursuing the passage of his progressive New Freedom domestic agenda. His first major priority was the Revenue Act of 1913, which began the modern income tax, and the Federal Reserve Act, which created the Federal Reserve System. At the outbreak of World War I in 1914, the U.S. declared neutrality as Wilson tried to negotiate peace between the Allied and Central Powers.

Wilson was narrowly re-elected in the 1916 election, defeating Republican nominee Charles Evans Hughes. In April 1917, Wilson asked Congress for a declaration of war against Germany in response to its policy of unrestricted submarine warfare that sank American merchant ships. Wilson concentrated on diplomacy, issuing the Fourteen Points that the Allies and Germany accepted as a basis for post-war peace. He wanted the off-year elections of 1918 to be a referendum endorsing his policies but instead the Republicans took control of Congress. After the Allied victory in November 1918, Wilson attended the Paris Peace Conference. Wilson successfully advocated for the establishment of a multinational organization, the League of Nations, which was incorporated into the Treaty of Versailles that he signed; back home, he rejected a Republican compromise that would have allowed the Senate to ratify the Versailles Treaty and join the League.

Wilson had intended to seek a third term in office but had a stroke in October 1919 that left him incapacitated. His wife and his physician controlled Wilson, and no significant decisions were made. Meanwhile, his policies alienated German- and Irish-American Democrats and the Republicans won a landslide in the 1920 election. In February 1924, he died at age 67. Into the 21st century, historians have criticized Wilson for supporting racial segregation, although they continue to rank Wilson as an above-average president for his accomplishments in office. Conservatives in particular have criticized him for expanding the federal government, while others have praised him decreasing the power of large corporations and have credited him for establishing modern liberalism.

== Early life and education ==
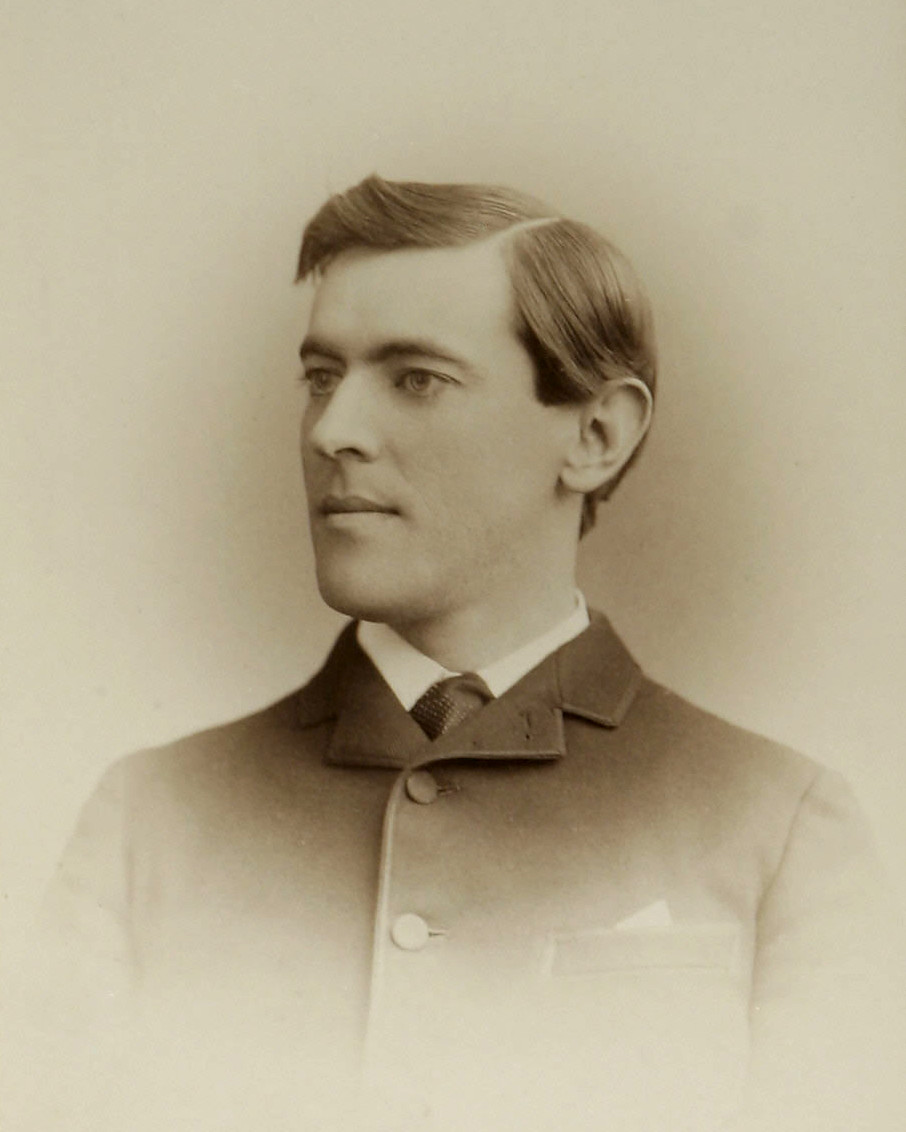
Wilson in 1875; at age 19

Thomas Woodrow Wilson was born to a family of Scotch-Irish and Scottish descent in Staunton, Virginia. He was the third of four children and the first son of Joseph Ruggles Wilson and Jessie Janet Woodrow. Wilson's paternal grandparents had immigrated to the United States from Strabane, County Tyrone, Ireland, in 1807, and settled in Steubenville, Ohio. Wilson's paternal grandfather James Wilson published a pro-tariff and anti-slavery newspaper, The Western Herald and Gazette. Wilson's maternal grandfather, the Reverend Thomas Woodrow, moved from Paisley, Renfrewshire, Scotland, to Carlisle, Cumbria, England, before migrating to Chillicothe, Ohio, in the late 1830s. Joseph met Jessie while she was attending a girls' academy in Steubenville, and the two married on June 7, 1849. Soon after the wedding, Joseph was ordained as a Presbyterian pastor and assigned to serve in Staunton. His son Woodrow was born in the Manse, a house in the Staunton First Presbyterian Church where Joseph served. Before he was two years old, the family moved to Augusta, Georgia.

Wilson's earliest memory of his early youth was of playing in his yard and standing near the front gate of the Augusta parsonage at the age of three, when he heard a passerby announce in disgust that Abraham Lincoln had been elected and that a war was coming. Wilson was one of only two U.S. presidents to be a citizen of the Confederate States of America; the other was John Tyler, who served as the nation's tenth president from 1841 to 1845. Wilson's father identified with the Southern United States and was a staunch supporter of the Confederacy during the American Civil War.

Wilson's father was one of the founders of the Presbyterian Church in the Confederate States of America, later renamed the Presbyterian Church in the United States (PCUS), following its 1861 split from the Northern Presbyterians. He became minister of the First Presbyterian Church in Augusta, and the family lived there until 1870. From 1870 to 1874, Wilson lived in Columbia, South Carolina, where his father was a theology professor at the Columbia Theological Seminary. In 1873, Wilson became a communicant member of the Columbia First Presbyterian Church; he remained a member throughout his life.

Wilson attended Davidson College in Davidson, North Carolina, in the 1873–74 school year but transferred as a freshman to the College of New Jersey, now Princeton University, where he studied political philosophy and history, joined the Phi Kappa Psi fraternity, and was active in the Whig literary and debating society. He was also elected secretary of the school's football association, president of the school's baseball association, and managing editor of the student newspaper. In the hotly contested presidential election of 1876, Wilson supported the Democratic Party and its nominee, Samuel J. Tilden.

After graduating from Princeton in 1879, Wilson attended the University of Virginia School of Law in Charlottesville, Virginia, where he was involved in the Virginia Glee Club and served as president of the Jefferson Literary and Debating Society. Poor health forced Wilson to withdraw from law school, but he continued to study law on his own while living with his parents in Wilmington, North Carolina. Wilson was admitted to the Georgia bar and made a brief attempt at establishing a law firm in Atlanta in 1882. Though he found legal history and substantive jurisprudence interesting, he abhorred the day-to-day procedural aspects of the practice of law. After less than a year, Wilson abandoned his legal practice to pursue the study of political science and history.

In late 1883, Wilson enrolled at the recently established Johns Hopkins University in Baltimore for doctoral studies in history, political science, German, and other fields. Wilson hoped to become a professor, writing that "a professorship was the only feasible place for me, the only place that would afford leisure for reading and for original work, the only strictly literary berth with an income attached."

Wilson spent much of his time at Johns Hopkins University writing Congressional Government: A Study in American Politics, which grew out of a series of essays in which he examined the workings of the federal government. In 1886, Wilson was awarded a Ph.D. in history and government from Johns Hopkins University, making him the only U.S. president in the nation's history to possess a Ph.D. In early 1885, Houghton Mifflin published Wilson's Congressional Government, which was well received, with one critic calling it "the best critical writing on the American constitution which has appeared since the 'Federalist' papers."

== Marriage and family ==
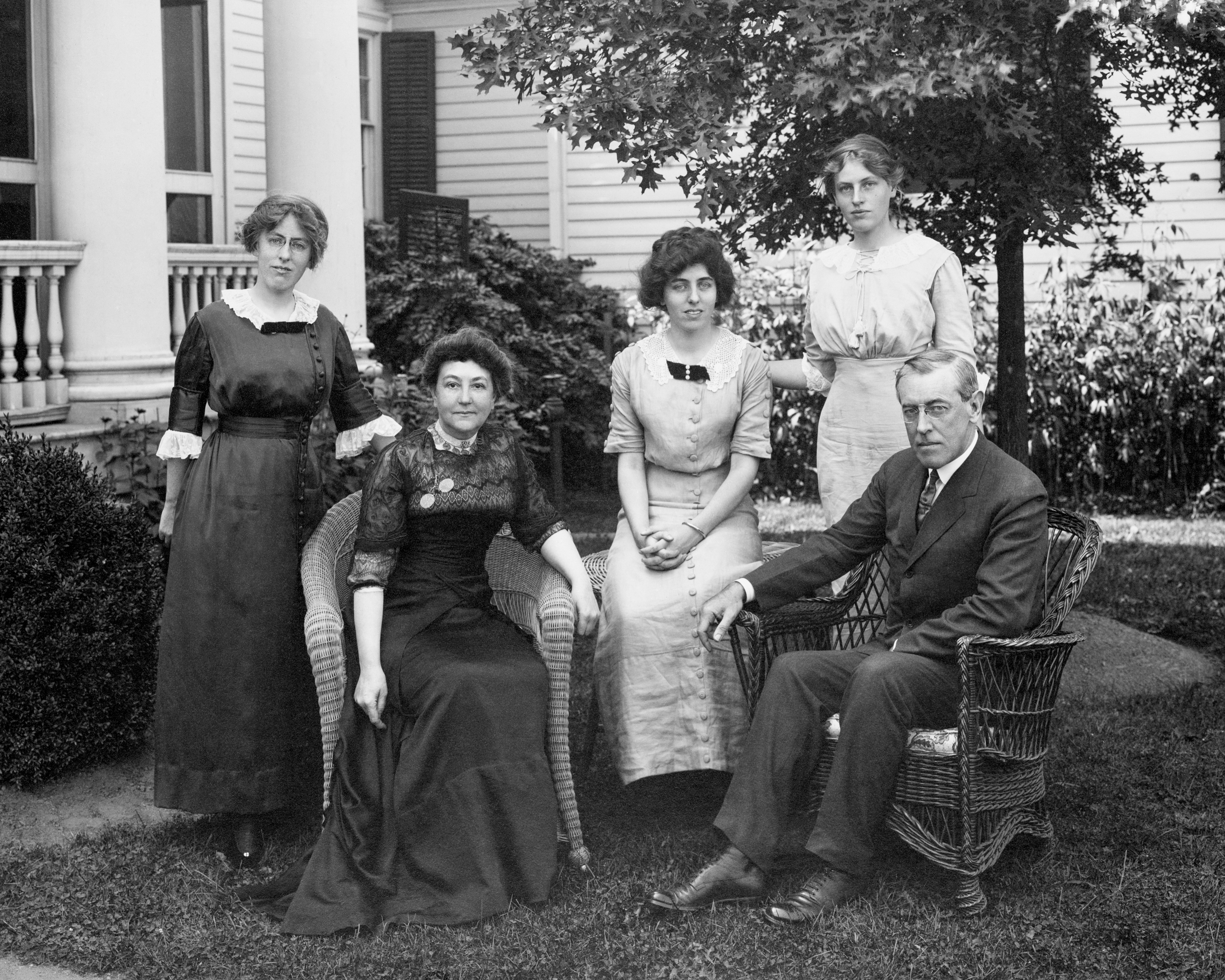
The Wilson family in 1912

In 1883, Wilson met and fell in love with Ellen Louise Axson. He proposed marriage in September 1883; she accepted, but they agreed to postpone marriage while Wilson attended graduate school. Axson graduated from Art Students League of New York, worked in portraiture, and received a medal for one of her works from the Exposition Universelle (1878) in Paris. She agreed to sacrifice further independent artistic pursuits in order to marry Wilson in 1885. Ellen learned German so she could help translate German-language political science publications relevant to Woodrow's research.

In April 1886, the couple's first child, Margaret, was born. Their second child, Jessie, was born in August 1887. Their third and final child, Eleanor, was born in October 1889. In 1913, Jessie married Francis Bowes Sayre Sr., who later served as High Commissioner to the Philippines. In 1914, their third child Eleanor married William Gibbs McAdoo, U.S. secretary of the treasury under Woodrow Wilson and later a U.S. senator from California.

== Academic career ==
=== Professor ===
From 1885 to 1888, Wilson taught at Bryn Mawr College, a newly established women's college in Bryn Mawr, Pennsylvania, outside Philadelphia. Wilson taught ancient Greek and Roman history, American history, political science, and other subjects. During this time, Wilson's 1887 journal article "The Study of Administration" was published in Political Science Quarterly. It argued that public administration should be considered its own field of study instead of a sub-field of political science, and that administrators should be separate but accountable to political leaders, who in turn are accountable to the people. The article is widely considered foundational in the field of public administration, and Wilson is credited as one of the field's founding fathers. Wilson's essay was influenced by Georg Wilhelm Friedrich Hegel's treatment of law and the state in Elements of the Philosophy of Right, especially Hegel's picture of how public institutions arise and mediate social conflict.

Wilson accepted a position at Wesleyan University, an undergraduate college for men in Middletown, Connecticut. He taught graduate courses in political economy and Western history, coached Wesleyan's football team, and founded a debate team.

In February 1890, with the help of friends, Wilson was appointed Chair of Jurisprudence and Political Economy at the College of New Jersey (the name at the time of Princeton University), at an annual salary of $3,000 (equivalent to $107,500 in 2025). Wilson quickly earned a reputation at Princeton as a compelling speaker. In 1896, Francis Landey Patton announced that College of New Jersey was being renamed Princeton University; an ambitious program of expansion for the university accompanied the name change. In the 1896 presidential election, Wilson rejected Democratic nominee William Jennings Bryan as too far to the left and instead supported the conservative "Gold Democrat" nominee, John M. Palmer. Wilson's academic reputation continued to grow throughout the 1890s, and he turned down multiple positions elsewhere, including at Johns Hopkins University and the University of Virginia.

At Princeton University, Wilson published several works of history and political science and was a regular contributor to Political Science Quarterly. Wilson's textbook, The State, was widely used in American college courses until the 1920s. In The State, Wilson wrote that governments could legitimately promote the general welfare "by forbidding child labor, by supervising the sanitary conditions of factories, by limiting the employment of women in occupations hurtful to their health, by instituting official tests of the purity or the quality of goods sold, by limiting the hours of labor in certain trades, [and] by a hundred and one limitations of the power of unscrupulous or heartless men to out-do the scrupulous and merciful in trade or industry." He also wrote that charity efforts should be removed from the private domain and "made the imperative legal duty of the whole", a position which, according to historian Robert M. Saunders, seemed to indicate that Wilson "was laying the groundwork for the modern welfare state." His third book, Division and Reunion (1893), became a standard university textbook for teaching mid- and late-19th century U.S. history. In 1902, Wilson published the five-volume book series A History of the American People, extensively covering the history of the United States from English colonization through the period following the American Civil War. Wilson had a considerable reputation as a historian and was an early member of the American Academy of Arts and Letters. He was also an elected member of the American Philosophical Society in 1897.

=== President of Princeton University ===
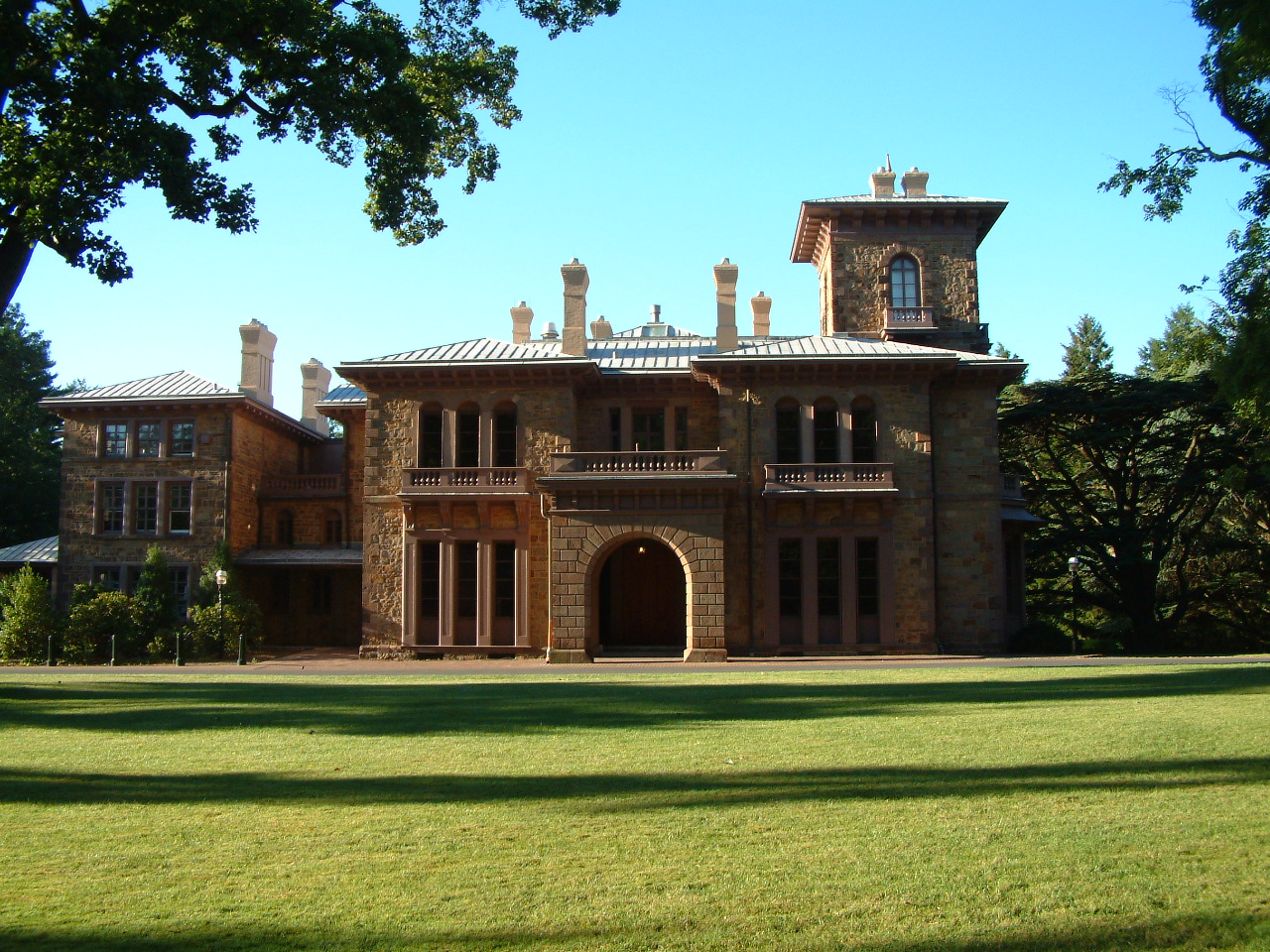
As president of Princeton University, Wilson lived in Prospect House on the university campus.

In June 1902, Princeton trustees promoted Professor Wilson to president, replacing Patton, whom the trustees perceived to be an inefficient administrator. Wilson aspired, as he told alumni, "to transform thoughtless boys performing tasks into thinking men." He tried to raise admission standards and to replace the "gentleman's C" with serious study. Wilson instituted academic departments and a system of core requirements to emphasize the development of expertise. Students were to meet in groups of six under the guidance of teaching assistants known as preceptors. To fund these new programs, Wilson undertook an ambitious and successful fundraising campaign, convincing alumni such as Moses Taylor Pyne and philanthropists such as Andrew Carnegie to donate to the school. Wilson appointed the first Jew and the first Roman Catholic to the faculty, and helped liberate the board from domination by conservative Presbyterians. He also worked to keep African Americans out of the school, even as other Ivy League schools were accepting small numbers of black people. (Note: Although a handful of elite, Northern schools admitted African-American students at the time, most colleges refused to accept black students. Most African-American college students attended black colleges and universities such as Howard University.)

Philosophy professor John Grier Hibben had known Wilson since they were undergraduates together. They became close friends. Indeed, when Wilson became president of Princeton in 1902 Hibben was his chief advisor. In 1912 Hibben stunned Wilson by taking the lead against Wilson's pet reform plan. They were permanently estranged, and Wilson was decisively defeated. In 1912, two years after Wilson left Princeton, Hibben became president of Princeton.

Wilson's efforts to reform Princeton earned him national fame, but they also took a toll on his health. In 1906, Wilson awoke to find himself blind in the left eye, the result of a blood clot and hypertension. Modern medical opinion surmises Wilson had had a stroke; he later was diagnosed, as his father had been, with hardening of the arteries. He began to exhibit his father's traits of impatience and intolerance, which would on occasion lead to errors of judgment.

In 1906, while vacationing in Bermuda, Wilson met Mary Hulbert Peck, a socialite. According to biographer August Heckscher II, Wilson's friendship with Peck became the topic of frank discussion between Wilson and his wife, although Wilson historians have not conclusively established there was an affair. Wilson also sent very personal letters to her, which were later used against him by his adversaries.

Having reorganized Princeton University's curriculum and established the preceptorial system, Wilson next attempted to curtail the influence of social elites at Princeton by abolishing the upper-class eating clubs. He proposed moving the students into colleges, also known as quadrangles, but Wilson's plan was met with fierce opposition from Princeton alumni. In October 1907, due to the intensity of alumni opposition, Princeton's board of trustees instructed Wilson to withdraw his plan for relocating student dormitories. Late in his tenure, Wilson had a confrontation with Andrew Fleming West, dean of Princeton University's graduate school and his ally, ex-President Grover Cleveland, who was a Princeton trustee. Wilson wanted to integrate a proposed graduate school building into the core of the campus, but West preferred a more distant campus site. In 1909, Princeton's board accepted a gift made to the graduate school campaign subject to the graduate school being located off campus.

Wilson became disenchanted with his job as Princeton University president due to the resistance to his recommendations, and he began considering a run for political office. Prior to the 1908 Democratic National Convention, Wilson dropped hints to some influential players in the Democratic Party of his interest in the ticket. While he had no real expectations of being placed on it, Wilson left instructions that he should not be offered the vice presidential nomination. Party regulars considered his ideas politically and geographically detached and fanciful, but the seeds of interest had been sown. In 1956, McGeorge Bundy described Wilson's contribution to Princeton: "Wilson was right in his conviction that Princeton must be more than a wonderfully pleasant and decent home for nice young men; it has been more ever since his time."

== Governor of New Jersey (1911–1913) ==
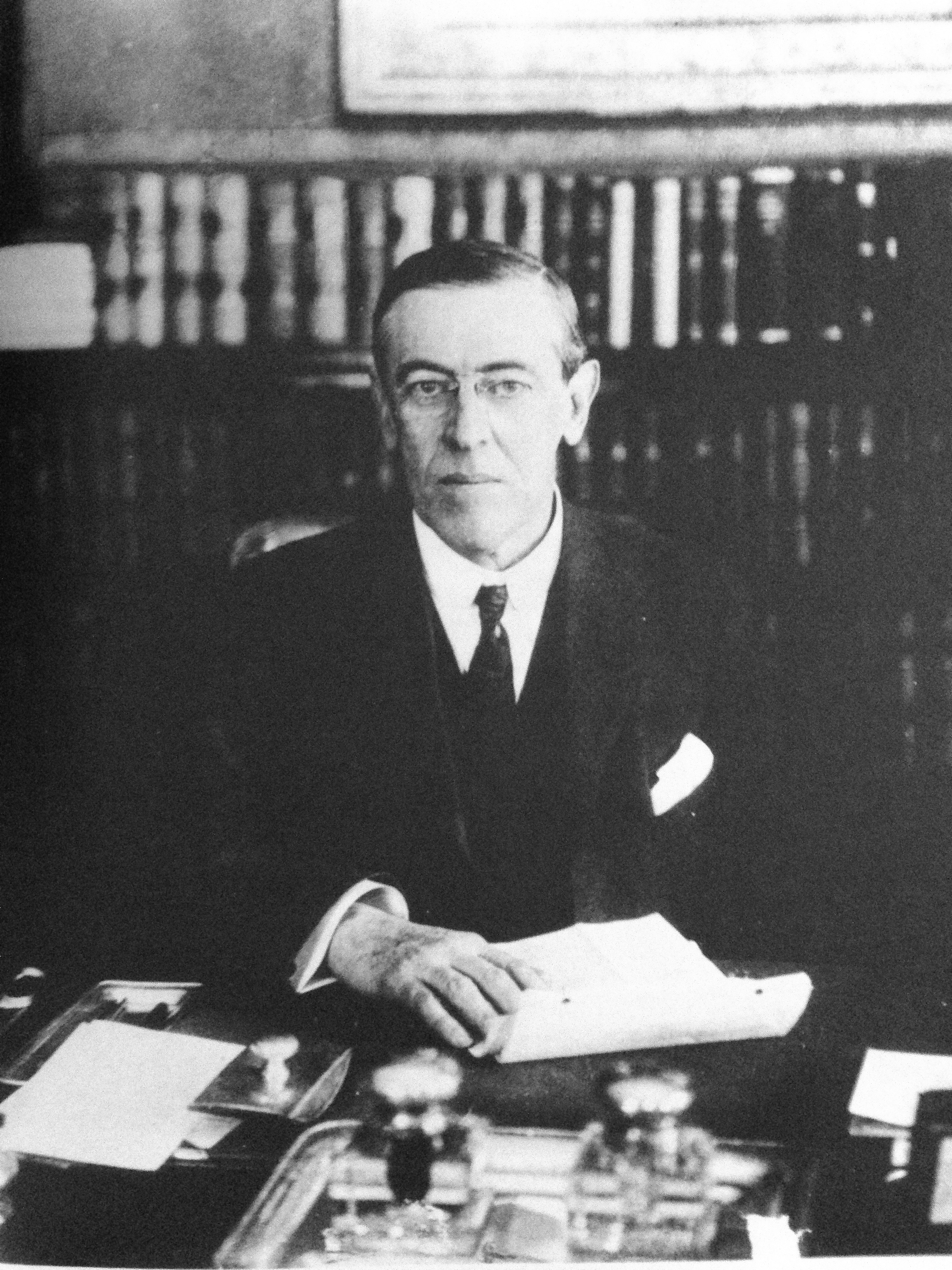
Official portrait, 1911

By January 1910, Wilson had drawn the attention of James Smith Jr. and George Brinton McClellan Harvey, two leaders of New Jersey's Democratic Party, as a potential candidate in the upcoming gubernatorial election. Having lost the last five gubernatorial elections, New Jersey Democratic leaders decided to throw their support behind Wilson, an untested and unconventional candidate. Party leaders believed that Wilson's academic reputation made him the ideal spokesman against trusts and corruption, but they also hoped his inexperience in governing would make him easy to influence. Wilson agreed to accept the nomination if "it came to me unsought, unanimously, and without pledges to anybody about anything."

At the state party convention, the bosses marshaled their forces and won the nomination for Wilson. On October 20, Wilson submitted his letter of resignation to Princeton University. Wilson's campaign focused on his promise to be independent of party bosses. He quickly shed his professorial style for more emboldened speechmaking and presented himself as a full-fledged progressive. Though Republican William Howard Taft had carried New Jersey in the 1908 presidential election by more than 82,000 votes, Wilson soundly defeated Republican gubernatorial nominee Vivian M. Lewis by a margin of more than 65,000 votes. Democrats also took control of the New Jersey General Assembly in the 1910 elections, though the New Jersey Senate remained in Republican hands. After winning the election, Wilson appointed Joseph Patrick Tumulty as his private secretary, a position he held throughout Wilson's political career.

Wilson began formulating his reformist agenda, intending to ignore the demands of his party machinery. Smith asked Wilson to endorse his bid for the U.S. Senate, but Wilson refused and instead endorsed Smith's opponent James Edgar Martine, who had won the Democratic primary. Martine's victory in the Senate election helped Wilson position himself as an independent force in the New Jersey Democratic Party. By the time Wilson took office, New Jersey had gained a reputation for public corruption; the state was known as the "Mother of Trusts" because it allowed companies like Standard Oil to escape the antitrust laws of other states. Wilson and his allies quickly won passage of the Geran bill, which undercut the power of the political bosses by requiring primaries for all elective offices and party officials. He was also successful with a corrupt practices law that required all candidates to file campaign financial statements, limited campaign expenditures, and prohibited corporate contributions to political campaigns. Additionally, Wilson supported passage of a workers' compensation law to aid the families of workers killed or injured on the job. For his success in passing these laws during the first months of his gubernatorial term, Wilson won national and bipartisan recognition as a reformer and a leader of the Progressive movement.

Republicans took control of the state assembly in early 1912, and Wilson spent much of the rest of his tenure vetoing bills. He nonetheless won passage of various reform laws including ones that restricted labor by women and children and increased standards for factory working conditions. A new State Board of Education was set up "with the power to conduct inspections and enforce standards, regulate districts' borrowing authority, and require special classes for students with handicaps." Before leaving office Wilson oversaw the establishment of free dental clinics and enacted a "comprehensive and scientific" poor law. Trained nursing was standardized, while contract labor in all reformatories and prisons was abolished and an indeterminate sentence act passed. A law was introduced that compelled all railroad companies "to pay their employees twice monthly", while regulation of the working hours, health, safety, employment, and age of people employed in mercantile establishments was carried out. Shortly before leaving office, Wilson signed a series of antitrust laws known as the "Seven Sisters", as well as another law that removed the power to select juries from local sheriffs.

== Presidential campaigns ==
=== 1912 presidential campaign ===
==== Democratic nomination ====
Wilson became a prominent 1912 presidential contender immediately upon his election as Governor of New Jersey in 1910, and his clashes with state party bosses enhanced his reputation with the rising Progressive movement. In addition to progressives, Wilson enjoyed the support of Princeton alumni such as Cyrus McCormick Jr. and Southerners such as Walter Hines Page, who believed that Wilson's status as a transplanted Southerner gave him broad appeal. Edward M. House from Texas was also instrumental in securing Wilson's bid for the presidency as campaign manager and became his chief advisor when he became president, where Wilson offered him any cabinet position he wanted, except Secretary of State, but House declined. Though Wilson's shift to the left won the admiration of many, it also created enemies such as George Brinton McClellan Harvey, a former Wilson supporter who had close ties to Wall Street. In July 1911, Wilson brought William Gibbs McAdoo in to manage the campaign. Prior to the 1912 Democratic National Convention, Wilson made a special effort to win the approval of three-time Democratic presidential nominee William Jennings Bryan, whose followers had largely dominated the Democratic Party since the 1896 presidential election.

Speaker of the House Champ Clark of Missouri was viewed by many as the front-runner for the nomination, while House Majority Leader Oscar Underwood of Alabama also loomed as a challenger. Clark found support among the Bryan wing of the party, while Underwood appealed to the conservative Bourbon Democrats, especially in the South. In the 1912 Democratic Party presidential primaries, Clark won several of the early contests, but Wilson finished strong with victories in Texas, the Northeast, and the Midwest. On the first presidential ballot of the Democratic convention, Clark won a plurality of delegates; his support continued to grow after the New York Tammany Hall machine swung behind him on the tenth ballot. Tammany's support backfired for Clark, as Bryan announced that he would not support any candidate that had Tammany's backing, and Clark began losing delegates on subsequent ballots. Wilson gained the support of Roger Charles Sullivan and Thomas Taggart by promising the vice presidency to Governor Thomas R. Marshall of Indiana. and several Southern delegations shifted their support from Underwood to Wilson. Wilson finally won two-thirds of the vote on the convention's 46th ballot, and Marshall became Wilson's running mate.

==== General election ====
In the 1912 general election, Wilson faced two major opponents: one-term Republican incumbent William Howard Taft, and former Republican President Theodore Roosevelt, who ran a third party campaign as the "Bull Moose" Party nominee. The fourth candidate was Eugene V. Debs of the Socialist Party. Roosevelt had broken with his former party at the 1912 Republican National Convention after Taft narrowly won re-nomination, and the split in the Republican Party made Democrats hopeful that they could win the presidency for the first time since the 1892 presidential election.

Roosevelt emerged as Wilson's main challenger, and Wilson and Roosevelt largely campaigned against each other despite sharing similarly progressive platforms that called for an interventionist central government. Wilson directed campaign finance chairman Henry Morgenthau not to accept contributions from corporations and to prioritize smaller donations from the widest possible quarters of the public. During the election campaign, Wilson asserted that it was the task of government "to make those adjustments of life which will put every man in a position to claim his normal rights as a living, human being." With the help of legal scholar Louis Brandeis, he developed his New Freedom platform, focusing especially on breaking up trusts and lowering tariff rates. Brandeis and Wilson rejected Roosevelt's proposal to establish a powerful bureaucracy charged with regulating large corporations, instead favoring the break-up of large corporations in order to create a level economic playing field.

Wilson engaged in a spirited campaign, criss-crossing the country to deliver numerous speeches. Ultimately, he took 41.8 percent of the popular vote and 435 of the 531 electoral votes. Roosevelt won most of the remaining electoral votes and 27.4 percent of the popular vote, one of the strongest third party performances in U.S. history. Taft won 23.2 percent of the popular vote but just 8 electoral votes, while Debs won 6 percent of the popular vote. In the concurrent congressional elections, Democrats retained control of the House and won a majority in the Senate. Wilson's victory made him the first Southerner to win a presidential election since the Civil War, the first Democratic president since Grover Cleveland left office in 1897, and the first and only president to hold a Ph.D.

Following his election, Wilson telegraphed William F. McCombs, the Chairman of the Democratic National Committee, expressing his view that

A great cause has triumphed. Every Democrat, every true progressive of whatever alliance, must now lend his full force and enthusiasm to the fulfillment of the people's hopes, the establishment of the people’s rights, so that justice and progress may go hand in hand.

=== 1916 presidential campaign ===
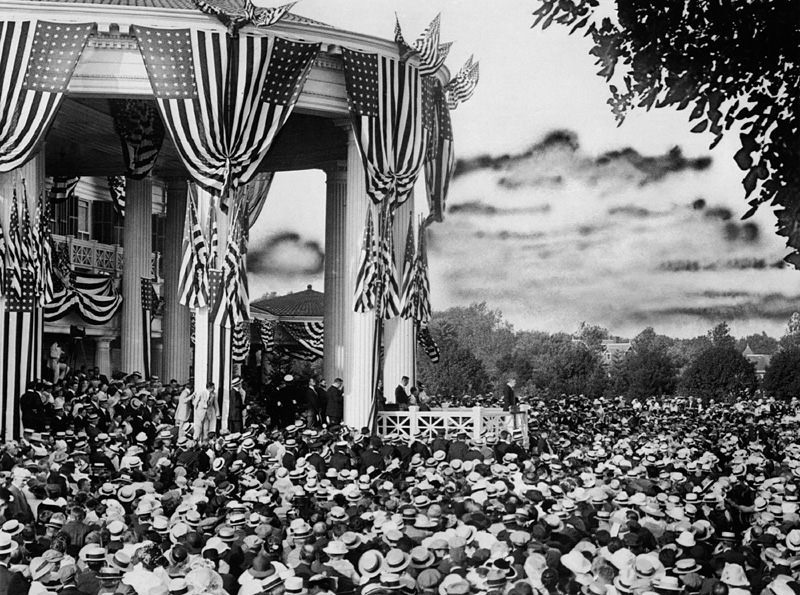
Wilson accepting the Democratic Party nomination for president in 1916

Wilson was renominated at the 1916 Democratic National Convention without opposition. In an effort to win progressive voters, Wilson called for legislation providing for an eight-hour day and six-day workweek, health and safety measures, the prohibition of child labor, and safeguards for female workers. He also favored a minimum wage for all work performed by and for the federal government. The Democrats also campaigned on the slogan "He Kept Us Out of War", and warned that a Republican victory would mean war with Germany. Hoping to reunify the progressive and conservative wings of the party, the 1916 Republican National Convention nominated Supreme Court justice Charles Evans Hughes for president; as a jurist, he had been completely out of politics by 1912. Though Republicans attacked Wilson's foreign policy on various grounds, domestic affairs generally dominated the campaign. Republicans campaigned against Wilson's New Freedom policies, especially tariff reduction, the new income taxes, and the Adamson Act, which they derided as "class legislation".

The election was close and the outcome was in doubt with Hughes ahead in the East, and Wilson in the South and West. The decision came down to California. On November 10, California certified that Wilson had won the state by 3,806 votes, giving him a majority of the electoral vote. Nationally, Wilson won 277 electoral votes and 49.2 percent of the popular vote, while Hughes won 254 electoral votes and 46.1 percent of the popular vote. Wilson was able to win by picking up many votes that had gone to Roosevelt or Debs in 1912. He swept the Solid South and won all but one Western state, while Hughes won most of the Northeastern and Midwestern states. Wilson's re-election made him the first Democrat since Andrew Jackson (in 1832) to win two consecutive terms. The Democrats kept control of Congress.

=== 1920 presidential campaign ===
Despite his medical incapacity, Wilson wanted to run for a third term. While the 1920 Democratic National Convention strongly endorsed Wilson's policies, Democratic leaders refused, nominating instead a ticket consisting of Governor James M. Cox and Assistant Secretary of the Navy Franklin D. Roosevelt. The Republicans centered their campaign around opposition to Wilson's policies, with Senator Warren G. Harding promising a "return to normalcy". Wilson largely stayed out of the campaign, although he endorsed Cox and continued to advocate for U.S. membership in the League of Nations. Harding won the election in a landslide, capturing over 60% of the popular vote and winning every state outside of the South. Wilson met with Harding for tea on his last day in office, March 3, 1921. Due to his health, Wilson was unable to attend the inauguration.

On December 10, 1920, Wilson was awarded the 1919 Nobel Peace Prize "for his role as founder of the League of Nations". Wilson became the second sitting United States president after Theodore Roosevelt to become a Nobel Peace Laureate.

== Presidency (1913–1921) ==
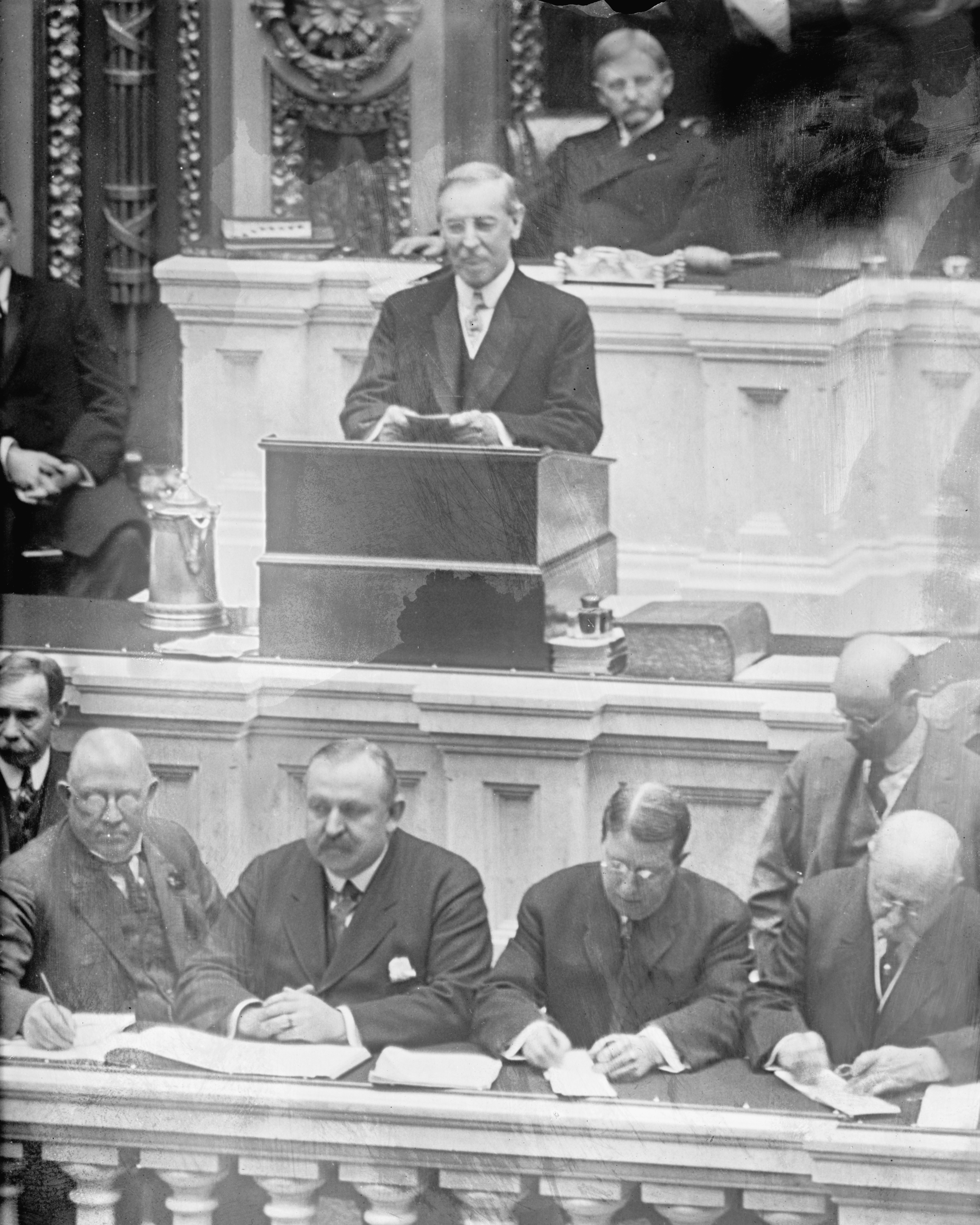
Wilson giving his first State of the Union address in 1913 before a joint session of Congress, which initiated the modern practice of the State of the Union being given in person before all members of Congress

After the election, Wilson chose William Jennings Bryan as Secretary of State, and Bryan offered advice on the remaining members of Wilson's cabinet. William Gibbs McAdoo, a prominent Wilson supporter who married Wilson's daughter in 1914, became Secretary of the Treasury, and James Clark McReynolds, who had successfully prosecuted several prominent antitrust cases, was chosen as Attorney General. Publisher Josephus Daniels, a party loyalist and prominent white supremacist from North Carolina, was chosen to be Secretary of the Navy, while young New York attorney Franklin D. Roosevelt became Assistant Secretary of the Navy. Wilson's chief of staff ("secretary") was Joseph Patrick Tumulty, who acted as a political buffer and intermediary with the press. The most important foreign policy adviser and confidant was "Colonel" Edward M. House; Berg writes that, "in access and influence, [House] outranked everybody in Wilson's Cabinet."

=== New Freedom domestic agenda ===
Wilson introduced a comprehensive program of domestic legislation at the outset of his administration, something no president had ever done before. He announced four major domestic priorities: the conservation of natural resources, banking reform, tariff reduction, and better access to raw materials for farmers by breaking up Western mining trusts. Wilson introduced these proposals in April 1913 in a speech delivered to a joint session of Congress, becoming the first president since John Adams to address Congress in person. Wilson's first two years in office largely focused on his domestic agenda. With trouble with Mexico and the outbreak of World War I in 1914, foreign affairs increasingly dominated his presidency.

==== Tariff and tax legislation ====
Democrats had long seen high tariff rates as equivalent to unfair taxes on consumers, and tariff reduction was their first priority. He argued that the system of high tariffs "cuts us off from our proper part in the commerce of the world, violates the just principles of taxation, and makes the government a facile instrument in the hands of private interests." By late May 1913, House Majority Leader Oscar Underwood had passed a bill in the House that cut the average tariff rate by 10 percent and imposed a tax on personal income above $4,000. Underwood's bill represented the largest downward revision of the tariff since the Civil War. It aggressively cut rates for raw materials, goods deemed to be "necessities", and products produced domestically by trusts, but it retained higher tariff rates for luxury goods.

Nevertheless, the passage of the tariff bill in the Senate was a challenge. Some Southern and Western Democrats wanted the continued protection of their wool and sugar industries, and Democrats had a narrower majority in the upper house. Wilson met extensively with Democratic senators and appealed directly to the people through the press. After weeks of hearings and debate, Wilson and Secretary of State Bryan managed to unite Senate Democrats behind the bill. The Senate voted 44 to 37 in favor of the bill, with only one Democrat voting against it and only one Republican voting for it. Wilson signed the Revenue Act of 1913 (called the Underwood Tariff) into law on October 3, 1913. The Revenue Act of 1913 reduced tariffs and replaced the lost revenue with a federal income tax of one percent on incomes above $3,000, affecting the richest three percent of the population. The policies of the Wilson administration had a durable impact on the composition of government revenue, which now primarily came from taxation rather than tariffs.

==== Federal Reserve System ====
Wilson did not wait to complete the Revenue Act of 1913 before proceeding to the next item on his agenda—banking. By the time Wilson took office, countries like Britain and Germany had established government-run central banks, but the United States had not had a central bank since the Bank War of the 1830s. In the aftermath of the nationwide financial crisis in 1907, there was general agreement to create some sort of central banking system to provide a more elastic currency and to coordinate responses to financial panics. Wilson sought a middle ground between progressives such as Bryan and conservative Republicans like Nelson Aldrich, who, as chairman of the National Monetary Commission, had put forward a plan for a central bank that would give private financial interests a large degree of control over the monetary system. Wilson declared that the banking system must be "public not private, [and] must be vested in the government itself so that the banks must be the instruments, not the masters, of business."

Democrats crafted a compromise plan in which private banks would control twelve regional Federal Reserve Banks, but a controlling interest in the system was placed in a central board filled with presidential appointees. Wilson convinced Democrats on the left that the new plan met their demands. Among the bill's critics was U.S. Representative Charles August Lindbergh, who argued that it would create an "invisible government" of the monetary power and concentrate economic control into a "purely profiteering group." The Senate voted 54–34 to approve the Federal Reserve Act. The new system began operations in 1915, and it played a key role in financing the Allied and American war efforts in World War I.

==== Antitrust legislation ====
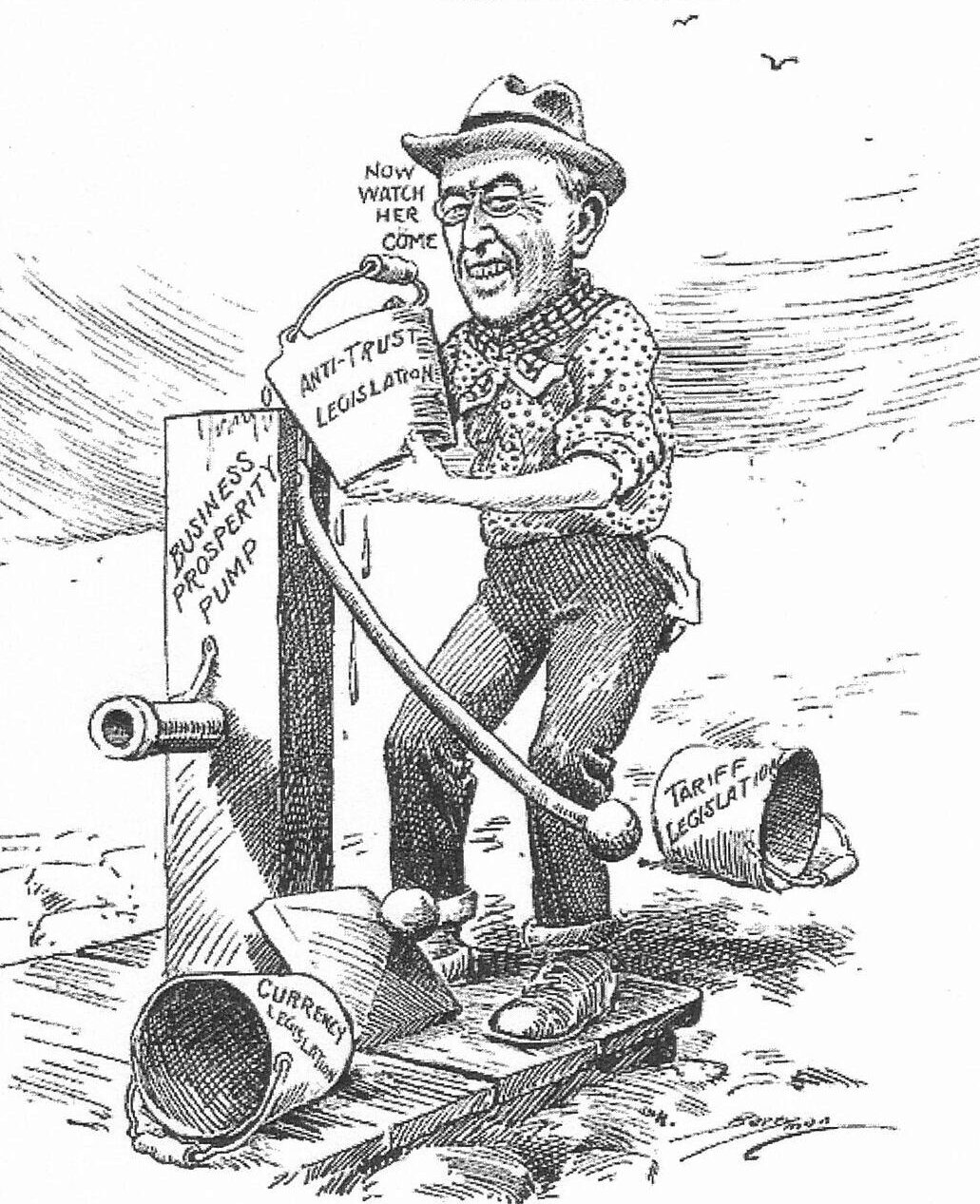
A 1913 Clifford K. Berryman political cartoon mocking Wilson's economic policy by portraying him pumping a business prosperity pump full of tariffs, currency, and anti-trust laws

Having passed major legislation lowering the tariff and reforming the banking structure, Wilson next sought antitrust legislation to enhance the Sherman Antitrust Act of 1890. The Sherman Antitrust Act barred any "contract, combination ... or conspiracy, in restraint of trade", but had proved ineffective in preventing the rise of large business combinations known as trusts. An elite group of businessmen dominated the boards of major banks and railroads, and they used their power to prevent competition by new companies. With Wilson's support, Congressman Henry Clayton, Jr. introduced a bill that would ban several anti-competitive practices such as discriminatory pricing, tying, exclusive dealing, and interlocking directorates.

As the difficulty of banning all anti-competitive practices via legislation became clear, Wilson came to back legislation that would create a new agency, the Federal Trade Commission (FTC), to investigate antitrust violations and enforce antitrust laws independently of the Justice Department. With bipartisan support, Congress passed the Federal Trade Commission Act of 1914, which incorporated Wilson's ideas regarding the FTC. One month after signing the Federal Trade Commission Act of 1914, Wilson signed the Clayton Antitrust Act of 1914, which built on the Sherman Act by defining and banning several anti-competitive practices.

==== Labor and agriculture ====
Wilson thought a child labor law would probably be unconstitutional but reversed himself in 1916 with a close election approaching. In 1916, after intense campaigns by the National Child Labor Committee (NCLC) and the National Consumers League, the Congress passed the Keating–Owen Act, making it illegal to ship goods in interstate commerce if they were made in factories employing children under specified ages. Southern Democrats were opposed but did not filibuster. Wilson endorsed the bill at the last minute under pressure from party leaders who stressed how popular the idea was, especially among the emerging class of women voters. He told Democratic Congressmen they needed to pass this law and also a workman's compensation law to satisfy the national progressive movement and to win the 1916 election against a reunited GOP. It was the first federal child labor law. However, the U.S. Supreme Court struck down the law in Hammer v. Dagenhart (1918). Congress then passed a law taxing businesses that used child labor, but that was struck down by the Supreme Court in Bailey v. Drexel Furniture (1923). Child labor was finally ended in the 1930s. He approved the goal of upgrading the harsh working conditions for merchant sailors and signed LaFollette's Seamen's Act of 1915.

During his political career, Wilson commissioned members of the Fraternal Order of Eagles to study old age pension laws overseas to determine whether such laws could be adopted in the United States. Pensions for civil servants employed by the federal government were introduced during Wilson's final year in office.

Wilson called on the Labor Department to mediate conflicts between labor and management. In 1914, Wilson dispatched soldiers to help bring an end to the Colorado Coalfield War, one of the deadliest labor disputes in American history. In 1916 he pushed Congress to enact the eight-hour work day for railroad workers, which ended a major strike. It was "the boldest intervention in labor relations that any president had yet attempted."

Wilson disliked the excessive government involvement in the Federal Farm Loan Act, which created twelve regional banks empowered to provide low-interest loans to farmers. Nevertheless, he needed the farm vote to survive the upcoming 1916 election, so he signed it.

==== Territories and immigration ====
Wilson embraced the long-standing Democratic policy against owning colonies, and he worked for the gradual autonomy and ultimate independence of the Philippines, which had been acquired in 1898. Continuing the policy of his predecessors, Wilson increased self-governance on the islands by granting Filipinos greater control over the Philippine Legislature. The Jones Act of 1916 committed the United States to the eventual independence of the Philippines, and granted Filipinos further autonomy with the establishment of a Filipino Senate and House of Representatives, replacing the American-run Philippine Commission and Filipino-run Philippine Assembly, respectively. In 1916, Wilson purchased by treaty the Danish West Indies, renamed as the United States Virgin Islands.

Immigration from Europe declined significantly once World War I began and Wilson paid little attention to the issue during his presidency. However, he looked favorably upon the "new immigrants" from southern and eastern Europe, and twice vetoed laws passed by Congress intended to restrict their entry, though the later veto was overridden.

==== Judicial appointments ====
Wilson nominated three men to the United States Supreme Court, all of whom were confirmed by the U.S. Senate. In 1914, Wilson nominated sitting attorney general James Clark McReynolds. Despite his credentials as an ardent trust buster, McReynolds became a staple of the court's conservative bloc until his retirement in 1941. According to Berg, Wilson considered appointing McReynolds one of his biggest mistakes in office. In 1916, Wilson nominated Louis Brandeis to the Court, setting off a major debate in the Senate over Brandeis's progressive ideology and his religion; Brandeis was the first Jewish nominee to the Supreme Court. Ultimately, Wilson was able to convince Senate Democrats to vote to confirm Brandeis, who served on the court until 1939. In contrast to McReynolds, Brandeis became one of the court's leading progressive voices. When a second vacancy arose in 1916, Wilson appointed progressive lawyer John Hessin Clarke. Clarke was confirmed by the Senate and served on the Court until retiring in 1922.

=== First-term foreign policy ===
Wilson sought to move away from the foreign policy of his predecessors, rejecting Taft's dollar diplomacy. He also used US foreign policy as an instrument to address the overproduction of US-manufactured goods, which exceeded domestic consumption. Wilson's administration supported governments that were amenable to importing US goods and opposed governments hostile to US economic interests.

==== Latin America ====
Wilson frequently intervened in Latin America, saying in 1913, "I am going to teach the South American republics to elect good men." The 1914 Bryan–Chamorro Treaty converted Nicaragua into a de facto protectorate, and the U.S. stationed soldiers there throughout Wilson's presidency. The Wilson administration sent troops to occupy the Dominican Republic and intervene in Haiti, and Wilson also authorized military interventions in Cuba, Panama, and Honduras.

Wilson took office during the Mexican Revolution, which had begun in 1911 after liberals overthrew the military dictatorship of Porfirio Díaz. Shortly before Wilson took office, conservatives retook power through a coup led by Victoriano Huerta. Wilson rejected the legitimacy of Huerta's "government of butchers" and demanded Mexico hold democratic elections. After Huerta arrested U.S. Navy personnel who had accidentally landed in a restricted zone near the northern port town of Tampico, Wilson dispatched the Navy to occupy the Mexican city of Veracruz. A strong backlash against the American intervention among Mexicans of all political affiliations convinced Wilson to abandon his plans to expand the U.S. military intervention, but the intervention nonetheless helped convince Huerta to flee from the country. A group led by Venustiano Carranza established control over a significant proportion of Mexico, and Wilson recognized Carranza's government in October 1915.

Carranza continued to face various opponents within Mexico, including Pancho Villa, whom Wilson had earlier described as "a sort of Robin Hood." In early 1916, Pancho Villa raided the village of Columbus, New Mexico, killing or wounding dozens of Americans and causing an enormous nationwide American demand for his punishment. Wilson ordered General John J. Pershing and 4,000 troops across the border to capture Villa. By April, Pershing's forces had broken up and dispersed Villa's bands, but Villa remained on the loose and Pershing continued his pursuit deep into Mexico. Carranza then pivoted against the Americans and accused them of a punitive invasion, leading to several incidents that nearly led to war. Tensions subsided after Mexico agreed to release several American prisoners, and bilateral negotiations began under the auspices of the Mexican-American Joint High Commission. Eager to withdraw from Mexico due to tensions in Europe, Wilson ordered Pershing to withdraw, and the last American soldiers left in February 1917.

==== Neutrality in World War I ====
World War I broke out in July 1914, pitting the Central Powers (Germany, Austria-Hungary, the Ottoman Empire, and later Bulgaria) against the Allied Powers (Britain, France, Russia, Serbia, and several other countries). The war fell into a long stalemate with very high casualties on the Western Front in France. Both sides rejected offers by Wilson and the House to mediate an end to the conflict. From 1914 until early 1917, Wilson's primary foreign policy objectives were to keep the United States out of the war in Europe and to broker a peace agreement. He insisted that all U.S. government actions be neutral, stating that Americans "must be impartial in thought as well as in action, must put a curb upon our sentiments as well as upon every transaction that might be construed as a preference of one party to the struggle before another." As a neutral power, the U.S. insisted on its right to trade with both sides. However, the powerful British Royal Navy imposed a blockade of Germany. To appease Washington, London agreed to continue purchasing certain major American commodities such as cotton at pre-war prices, and in the event an American merchant vessel was caught with contraband, the Royal Navy was under orders to buy the entire cargo and release the vessel. Wilson passively accepted this situation.

In response to the British blockade, Germany launched a submarine campaign against merchant vessels in the seas surrounding the British Isles. In early 1915, the Germans sank three American ships; Wilson took the view, based on some reasonable evidence, that these incidents were accidental, and a settlement of claims could be postponed until the end of the war. In May 1915, a German submarine torpedoed the British ocean liner RMS Lusitania, killing 1,198 passengers, including 128 American citizens. Wilson publicly responded by saying, "there is such a thing as a man being too proud to fight. There is such a thing as a nation being so right that it does not need to convince others by force that it is right". Wilson demanded that the German government "take immediate steps to prevent the recurrence" of incidents like the sinking of the Lusitania. In response, Bryan, who believed that Wilson had placed the defense of American trade rights above neutrality, resigned from the Cabinet. In March 1916, the SS Sussex, an unarmed ferry under the French flag, was torpedoed in the English Channel and four Americans were counted among the dead. Wilson extracted from Germany a pledge to constrain submarine warfare to the rules of cruiser warfare, which represented a major diplomatic concession.

Interventionists, led by Theodore Roosevelt, wanted war with Germany and attacked Wilson's refusal to build up the army in anticipation of war. After the sinking of the Lusitania and the resignation of Bryan, Wilson publicly committed himself to what became known as the "preparedness movement", and began to build up the army and the navy. In June 1916, Congress passed the National Defense Act of 1916, which established the Reserve Officers' Training Corps and expanded the National Guard. Later in the year, Congress passed the Naval Act of 1916, which provided for a major expansion of the navy.

=== Second marriage ===
The health of Ellen Wilson declined after her husband entered office, and doctors diagnosed her with Bright's disease in July 1914. She died on August 6, 1914. President Wilson was deeply affected by the loss, falling into depression. On March 18, 1915, Wilson met Edith Bolling Galt at a White House tea. Galt was a widow and jeweler who was also from the South. After several meetings, Wilson fell in love with her, and he proposed marriage to her in May 1915. Galt initially rebuffed him, but Wilson was undeterred and continued the courtship. Edith gradually warmed to the relationship, and they became engaged in September 1915. They were married on December 18, 1915. Woodrow Wilson joined John Tyler and Grover Cleveland as the only presidents to marry while in office.

=== Entering World War I ===
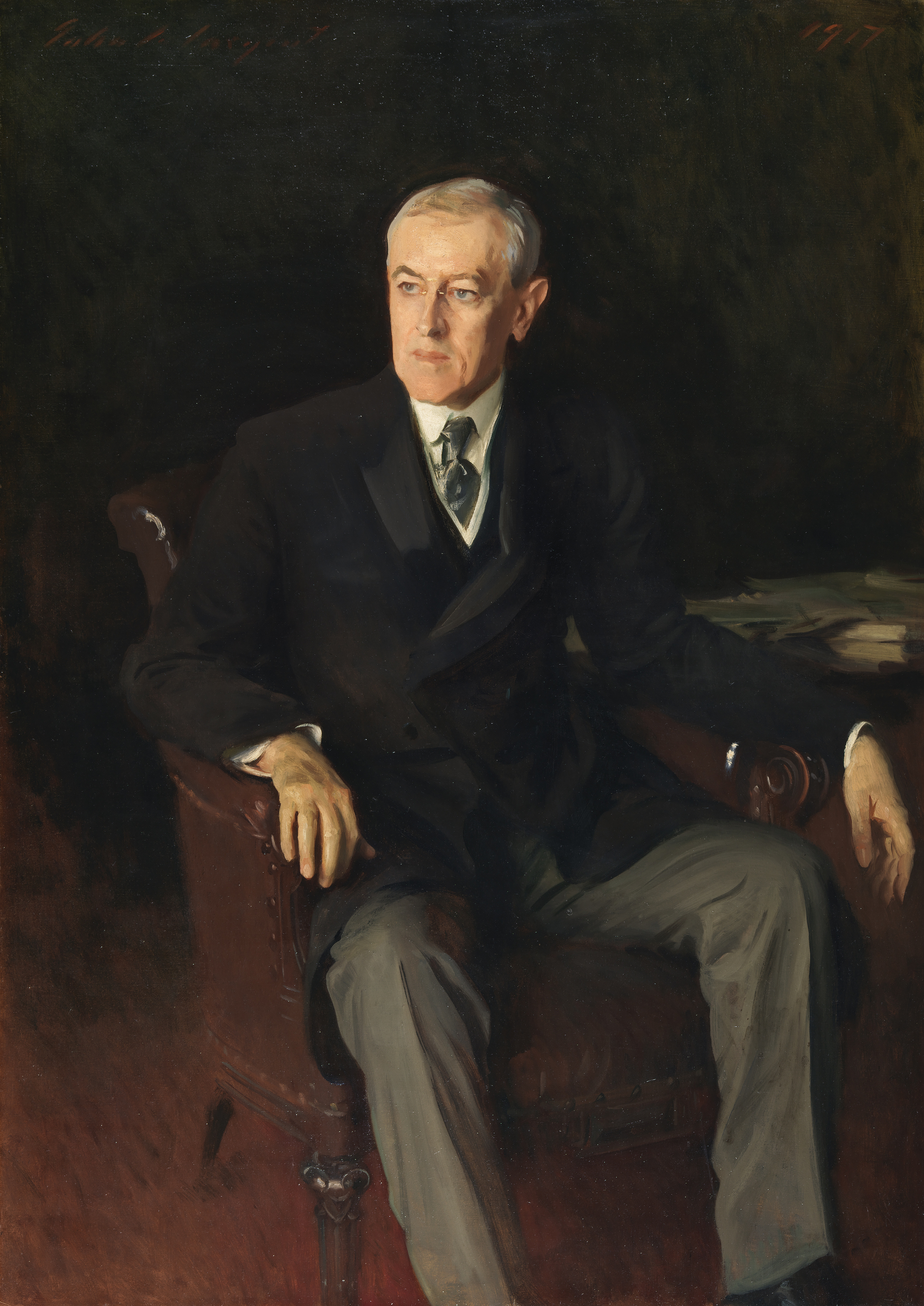
Portrait of Woodrow Wilson by John Singer Sargent, 1917

In January 1917, the German Empire initiated a new policy of unrestricted submarine warfare against ships in the seas around the British Isles. German leaders knew that the policy would likely provoke U.S. entrance into the war, but they hoped to defeat the Allied Powers before the U.S. could fully mobilize. In late February, the U.S. public learned of the Zimmermann Telegram, a secret diplomatic communication in which Germany sought to convince Mexico to join it in a war against the United States. After a series of attacks on American ships, Wilson held a Cabinet meeting on March 20; all Cabinet members agreed that the time had come for the United States to enter the war. The Cabinet members believed that Germany was engaged in a commercial war against the United States, and that the United States had to respond with a formal declaration of war.

On April 2, 1917, Wilson addressed the U.S. Congress, asking for a declaration of war against Germany, saying that Germany was engaged in "nothing less than war against the government and people of the United States." He requested a military draft to raise the army, increased taxes to pay for military expenses, loans to Allied governments, and increased industrial and agricultural production. He stated, "we have no selfish ends to serve. We desire no conquest, no dominion... no material compensation for the sacrifices we shall freely make. We are but one of the champions of the rights of mankind. We shall be satisfied when those rights have been made as secure as the faith and freedom of the nations can make them." The declaration of war by the United States against Germany passed Congress with strong bipartisan majorities on April 6, 1917. The United States later declared war against Austria-Hungary in December 1917.

With the U.S. entrance into the war, Wilson and Secretary of War Newton D. Baker launched an expansion of the army, with the goal of creating a 300,000-member Regular Army, a 440,000-member National Guard, and a 500,000-member conscripted force known as the "National Army". Despite some resistance to conscription and to the commitment of American soldiers abroad, large majorities of both houses of Congress voted to impose conscription with the Selective Service Act of 1917. Seeking to avoid the draft riots of the Civil War, the bill established local draft boards that were charged with determining who should be drafted. By the end of the war, nearly 3 million men had been drafted. The navy also saw tremendous expansion, and Allied shipping losses dropped substantially due to U.S. contributions and a new emphasis on the convoy system.

==== Fourteen Points ====
Wilson sought the establishment of "an organized common peace" that would help prevent future conflicts. In this goal, he was opposed not just by the Central Powers, but also the other Allied Powers, who, to various degrees, sought to win concessions and to impose a punitive peace agreement on the Central Powers. On January 8, 1918, Wilson delivered a speech, known as the Fourteen Points, wherein he articulated his administration's long term war objectives. Wilson called for the establishment of an association of nations to guarantee the independence and territorial integrity of all nations—a League of Nations. Other points included the evacuation of occupied territory, the establishment of an independent Poland, and self-determination for the peoples of Austria-Hungary and the Ottoman Empire.

==== Course of the war ====
Under the command of General Pershing, the American Expeditionary Forces first arrived in France in mid-1917. Wilson and Pershing rejected the British and French proposal that American soldiers integrate into existing Allied units, giving the United States more freedom of action but requiring for the creation of new organizations and supply chains. Russia exited the war after signing the Treaty of Brest-Litovsk in March 1918, allowing Germany to shift soldiers from the Eastern Front of the war. Hoping to break Allied lines before American soldiers could arrive in full force, the Germans launched the Spring Offensive on the Western Front. Both sides suffered hundreds of thousands of casualties as the Germans forced back the British and French, but Germany was unable to capture the French capital of Paris. There were only 175,000 American soldiers in Europe at the end of 1917, but by mid-1918 10,000 Americans were arriving in Europe per day. With American forces having joined in the fight, the Allies defeated Germany in the Battle of Belleau Wood and the Battle of Château-Thierry. Beginning in August, the Allies launched the Hundred Days Offensive, pushing back the exhausted German army. Meanwhile, French and British leaders convinced Wilson to send a few thousand American soldiers to join the Allied intervention in Russia, which was in the midst of a civil war between the Communist Bolsheviks and the White movement.

By the end of September 1918, the German leadership no longer believed it could win the war, and Kaiser Wilhelm II appointed a new government led by Prince Maximilian of Baden. Baden immediately sought an armistice with Wilson, with the Fourteen Points to serve as the basis of the German surrender. House procured agreement to the armistice from France and Britain, but only after threatening to conclude a unilateral armistice without them. Germany and the Allied Powers brought an end to the fighting with the signing of the Armistice of 11 November 1918. Austria-Hungary had signed the Armistice of Villa Giusti eight days earlier, while the Ottoman Empire had signed the Armistice of Mudros in October. By the end of the war, 116,000 American servicemen had died, and another 200,000 had been wounded.

==== Home front ====
With the American entrance into World War I in April 1917, Wilson became a war-time president. The War Industries Board, headed by Bernard Baruch, was established to set U.S. war manufacturing policies and goals. Future President Herbert Hoover led the Food Administration; the Federal Fuel Administration, run by Harry Augustus Garfield, introduced daylight saving time and rationed fuel supplies; William McAdoo was in charge of war bond efforts; Vance C. McCormick headed the War Trade Board. These men, known collectively as the "war cabinet", met weekly with Wilson. Because he was heavily focused on foreign policy during World War I, Wilson delegated a large degree of authority over the home front to his subordinates. In the midst of the war, the federal budget soared from $1 billion in fiscal year 1916 to $19 billion in fiscal year 1919. In addition to spending on its own military build-up, Wall Street in 1914–1916 and the Treasury in 1917–1918 provided large loans to the Allied countries, thus financing the war effort of Britain and France.

Seeking to avoid the high levels of inflation that had accompanied the heavy borrowing of the American Civil War, the Wilson administration raised taxes during the war. The War Revenue Act of 1917 and the Revenue Act of 1918 raised the top tax rate to 77 percent, greatly increased the number of Americans paying the income tax, and levied an excess profits tax on businesses and individuals. Despite these tax acts, the United States was forced to borrow heavily to finance the war effort. Treasury Secretary McAdoo authorized the issuing of low-interest war bonds and, to attract investors, made interest on the bonds tax-free. The bonds proved so popular among investors that many borrowed money in order to buy more bonds. The purchase of bonds, along with other war-time pressures, resulted in rising inflation, though this inflation was partly matched by rising wages and profits.

To shape public opinion, Wilson in 1917 established the first modern propaganda office, the Committee on Public Information (CPI), headed by George Creel. Wilson called on voters in the 1918 off-year elections to elect Democrats as an endorsement of his policies. However the Republicans won over alienated German-Americans and took control. Wilson refused to coordinate or compromise with the new leaders of House and Senate—Senator Henry Cabot Lodge became his nemesis. In November 1919, Wilson's attorney general, A. Mitchell Palmer, began to target anarchists, Industrial Workers of the World members, and other antiwar groups in what became known as the Palmer Raids. Thousands were arrested for incitement to violence, espionage, or sedition. Wilson by that point was incapacitated and was not told what was happening.

=== Aftermath of World War I ===
==== Paris Peace Conference ====
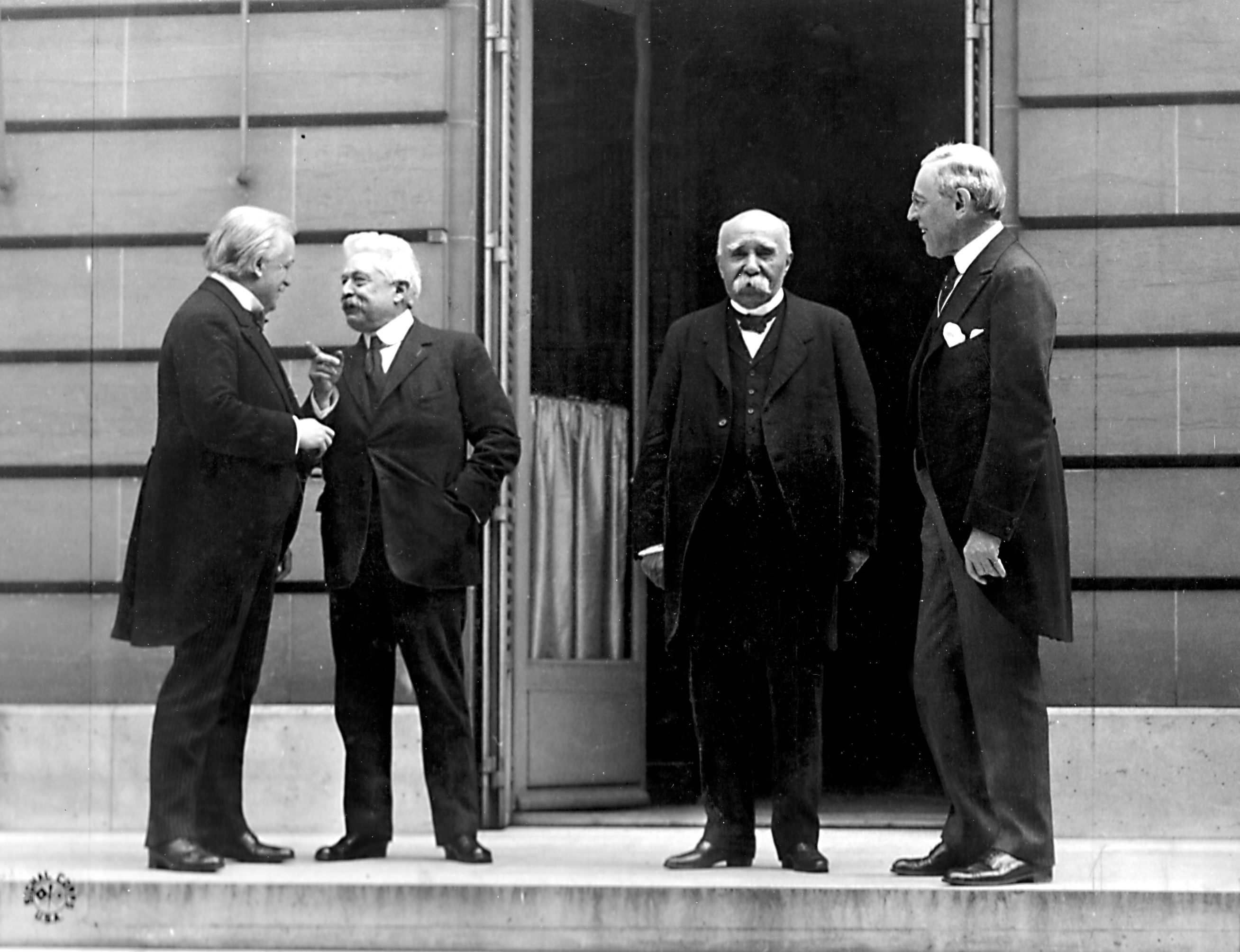
The "Big Four" at the Paris Peace Conference on May 27, 1919, following the end of World War I with Wilson standing next to Georges Clemenceau on the right

After the signing of the armistice, Wilson traveled to Europe to lead the American delegation to the Paris Peace Conference, thereby becoming the first incumbent president to travel to Europe. Although Republicans now controlled Congress, Wilson shut them out. Senate Republicans and even some Senate Democrats complained about their lack of representation in the delegation. It consisted of Wilson, Colonel House, (Note: House and Wilson fell out during the Paris Peace Conference, and House no longer played a role in the administration after June 1919.) Secretary of State Robert Lansing, General Tasker H. Bliss, and diplomat Henry White, who was the only Republican, and he was not an active partisan. Save for a two-week return to the United States, Wilson remained in Europe for six months, where he focused on reaching a peace treaty to formally end the war. Wilson, British Prime Minister David Lloyd George, French Prime Minister Georges Clemenceau, and Italian Prime Minister Vittorio Emanuele Orlando made up the "Big Four", the Allied leaders with the most influence at the Paris Peace Conference. Wilson had an illness during the conference, and some experts believe the Spanish flu was the cause.

Unlike other Allied leaders, Wilson did not seek territorial gains or material concessions from the Central Powers. His chief goal was the establishment of the League of Nations, which he saw as the "keystone of the whole programme". Wilson himself presided over the committee that drafted the Covenant of the League of Nations. The covenant bound members to respect freedom of religion, treat racial minorities fairly, and peacefully settle disputes through organizations like the Permanent Court of International Justice. Article X of the League Covenant required all nations to defend League members against external aggression. Japan proposed that the conference endorse a Racial Equality Proposal; The chairman, Woodrow Wilson, overturned it by saying that although the proposal had been approved by a clear majority, the particular matter had strong opposition manifest itself (despite the lack of any actual votes against the proposal) and that on this issue, a unanimous vote would be required. French delegate Ferdinand Larnaude [la; sv] immediately stated that "a majority had voted for the amendment." Meanwhile, the Japanese delegation wanted the transcript to show that a clear majority had been voted for the amendment. The Covenant of the League of Nations was incorporated into the conference's Treaty of Versailles, which ended the war with Germany, and into other peace treaties.

Aside from the establishment the League of Nations and solidifying a lasting world peace, Wilson's other main goal at the Paris Peace Conference was that self-determination be the primary basis used for drawing new international borders. However, in pursuit of his League of Nations, Wilson conceded several points to the other powers present at the conference. Germany was required to permanently cede territory, pay war reparations, relinquish all of her overseas colonies and dependencies and submit to military occupation in the Rhineland. Additionally, a clause in the treaty specifically named Germany as responsible for the war. Wilson agreed to allowing the Allied European powers and Japan to essentially expand their empires by establishing de facto colonies in the Middle East, Africa, and Asia out the former German and Ottoman Empires; these territorial awards to the victorious countries were thinly disguised as "League of Nations mandates". The Japanese acquisition of German interests in the Shandong Peninsula of China proved especially unpopular, as it undercut Wilson's promise of self-government. Wilson's hopes for achieving self-determination saw some success when the conference recognized multiple new and independent states created in Eastern Europe, including Albania, Czechoslovakia, Poland, and Yugoslavia.

The conference finished negotiations in May 1919, at which point the new leaders of republican Germany viewed the treaty for the first time. Some German leaders favored repudiating the peace due to the harshness of the terms, though ultimately Germany signed the treaty on June 28, 1919. Wilson was unable to convince the other Allied powers, France in particular, to temper the harshness of the settlement being leveled at the defeated Central Powers, especially Germany. For his efforts towards creating a lasting world peace, Wilson was awarded the 1919 Nobel Peace Prize.

==== Ratification debate and defeat ====
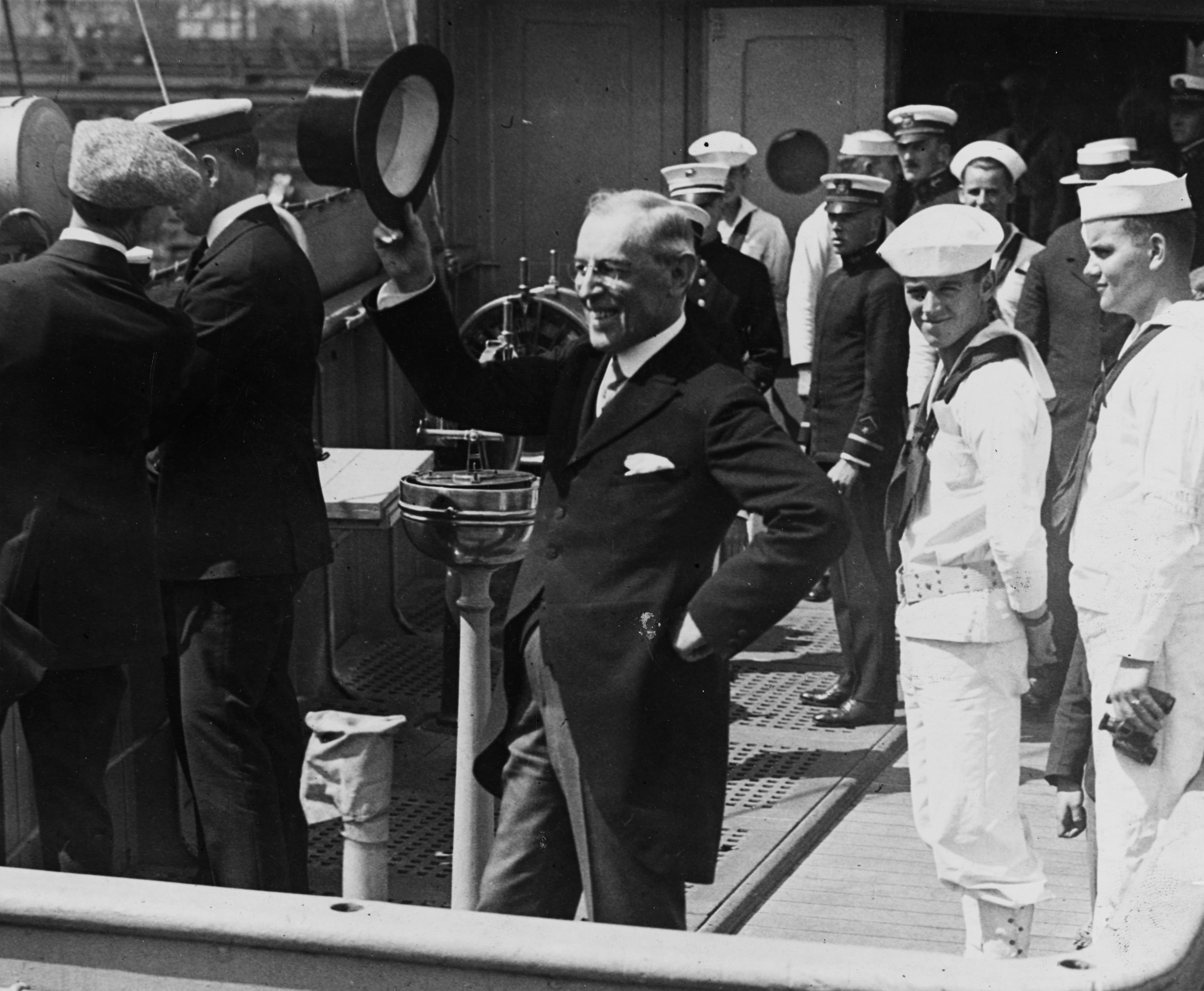
Wilson returning from the Versailles Peace Conference on USS George Washington, as she steamed up New York Harbor on July 8, 1919; the Weimar National Assembly in Germany formally ratified the treaty the following day in a vote of 209 to 116.

Ratification of the Treaty of Versailles required the support of two-thirds of the Senate, a difficult proposition given that Republicans held a narrow majority in the Senate after the 1918 U.S. elections. Republicans were outraged by Wilson's failure to discuss the war or its aftermath with them, and an intensely partisan battle developed in the Senate. Republican Senator Henry Cabot Lodge supported a version of the treaty that required Wilson to compromise. Wilson refused. Some Republicans, including former President Taft and former Secretary of State Elihu Root, favored ratification of the treaty with some modifications, and their public support gave Wilson some chance of winning the treaty's ratification.

The debate over the treaty centered around a debate over the American role in the world community in the post-war era, and senators fell into three main groups. The first group, consisting of most Democrats, favored the treaty. Fourteen senators, mostly Republicans, were known as the "irreconcilables" as they completely opposed U.S. entrance into the League of Nations. Some of these irreconcilables opposed the treaty for its failure to emphasize decolonization and disarmament, while others feared surrendering American freedom of action to an international organization. The remaining group of senators, known as "reservationists", accepted the idea of the League but sought varying degrees of change to ensure the protection of American sovereignty and the right of Congress to decide on going to war.

Article X of the League Covenant, which sought to create a system of collective security by requiring League members to protect one another against external aggression, seemed to force the U.S. to join in any war the League decided upon. Wilson consistently refused to compromise, partly due to concerns about having to re-open negotiations with the other treaty signatories. When Lodge was on the verge of building a two-thirds majority to ratify the Treaty with ten reservations, Wilson forced his supporters to vote Nay on March 19, 1920, thereby closing the issue. Cooper says that "nearly every League advocate" went along with Lodge, but their efforts "failed solely because Wilson admittedly rejected all reservations proposed in the Senate." Thomas A. Bailey calls Wilson's action "the supreme act of infanticide". He adds: "The treaty was slain in the house of its friends rather than in the house of its enemies. In the final analysis it was not the two-thirds rule, or the 'irreconcilables,' or Lodge, or the 'strong' and 'mild' reservationists, but Wilson and his docile following who delivered the fatal stab."

==== Health collapses ====
To bolster public support for ratification, Wilson barnstormed the Western states, but he returned to the White House in late September due to health problems. On October 2, 1919, Wilson suffered a serious stroke, leaving him paralyzed on his left side, and with only partial vision in the right eye. He was confined to bed for weeks and sequestered from everyone except his wife, his physician, Cary Grayson, and consulting neurologist Francis Xavier Dercum. Bert E. Park, a neurosurgeon who examined Wilson's medical records after his death, writes that Wilson's illness affected his personality in various ways, making him prone to "disorders of emotion, impaired impulse control, and defective judgment." Anxious to help the president recover, Tumulty, Grayson, and the First Lady determined what documents the president read and who was allowed to communicate with him. For her influence in the administration, some have described Edith Wilson as "the first female President of the United States." Link states that by November 1919, Wilson's "recovery was only partial at best. His mind remained relatively clear; but he was physically enfeebled, and the disease had wrecked his emotional constitution and aggravated all his more unfortunate personal traits.

Throughout late 1919, Wilson's inner circle concealed the severity of his health issues. By February 1920, the president's true condition was publicly known. Many expressed qualms about Wilson's fitness for the presidency at a time when the League fight was reaching a climax, and domestic issues such as strikes, unemployment, inflation and the threat of Communism were ablaze. In mid-March 1920, Lodge and his Republicans formed a coalition with the pro-treaty Democrats to pass a treaty with reservations, but Wilson rejected this compromise and enough Democrats followed his lead to defeat ratification. No one close to Wilson was willing to certify, as required by the Constitution, his "inability to discharge the powers and duties of the said office." Though some members of Congress encouraged Vice President Marshall to assert his claim to the presidency, Marshall never attempted to replace Wilson. Wilson's lengthy period of incapacity while serving as president was nearly unprecedented; of the previous presidents, only James Garfield had been in a similar situation, but Garfield retained greater control of his mental faculties and faced relatively few pressing issues.

==== Demobilization ====
When the war ended the Wilson Administration dismantled the wartime boards and regulatory agencies. Demobilization was chaotic and at times violent; four million soldiers were sent home with little money and few benefits. In 1919, strikes in major industries broke out, disrupting the economy. The country experienced further turbulence as a series of race riots broke out in the summer of 1919. In 1920, the economy plunged into a severe economic depression, unemployment rose to 12 percent, and the price of agricultural products sharply declined.

==== Red Scare and Palmer Raids ====
Following the Bolshevik Revolution in Russia and similar revolutionary attempts in Germany and Hungary, many Americans feared an increase in the influence of far-left movements in the United States. Such concerns were inflamed by the bombings in April 1919 when anarchists mailed 38 bombs to prominent Americans; one person was killed but most packages were intercepted. Nine more mail bombs were sent in June, injuring several people. Fresh fears combined with a patriotic national mood sparking the "First Red Scare" in 1919. Attorney General Palmer from November 1919 to January 1920 launched the Palmer Raids to suppress radical organizations. Over 10,000 people were arrested and 556 aliens were deported, including Emma Goldman. Palmer's activities met resistance from the courts and some senior administration officials. No one told Wilson what Palmer was doing. Later in 1920, the Wall Street bombing on September 16 killed 40 and injured hundreds in the deadliest terrorist attack on American soil up to that point. Anarchists took credit and promised more violence; they escaped capture.

==== Prohibition and women's suffrage ====
Prohibition developed as an unstoppable reform during World War I, but the Wilson administration played only a minor role. The Eighteenth Amendment passed Congress and was ratified by the states in 1919. In October 1919, Wilson vetoed the Volstead Act, legislation designed to enforce Prohibition, but his veto was overridden by Congress.

Wilson opposed women's suffrage in 1911 because he believed women lacked the public experience needed to be good voters. The actual evidence of how women voters behaved in the western states changed his mind, and he came to feel they could indeed be good voters. He did not speak publicly on the issue except to echo the Democratic Party position that suffrage was a state matter, primarily because of strong opposition in the white South to black voting rights.

In a 1918 speech before Congress, Wilson for the first time backed a national right to vote: "We have made partners of the women in this war....Shall we admit them only to a partnership of suffering and sacrifice and toil and not to a partnership of privilege and right?" The House passed a constitutional amendment providing for women's suffrage nationwide, but this stalled in the Senate. Wilson continually pressured the Senate to vote for the amendment, telling senators that its ratification was vital to winning the war. The Senate finally approved it in June 1919, and the requisite number of states ratified the Nineteenth Amendment in August 1920.

== Post-presidency and death (1921–1924) ==
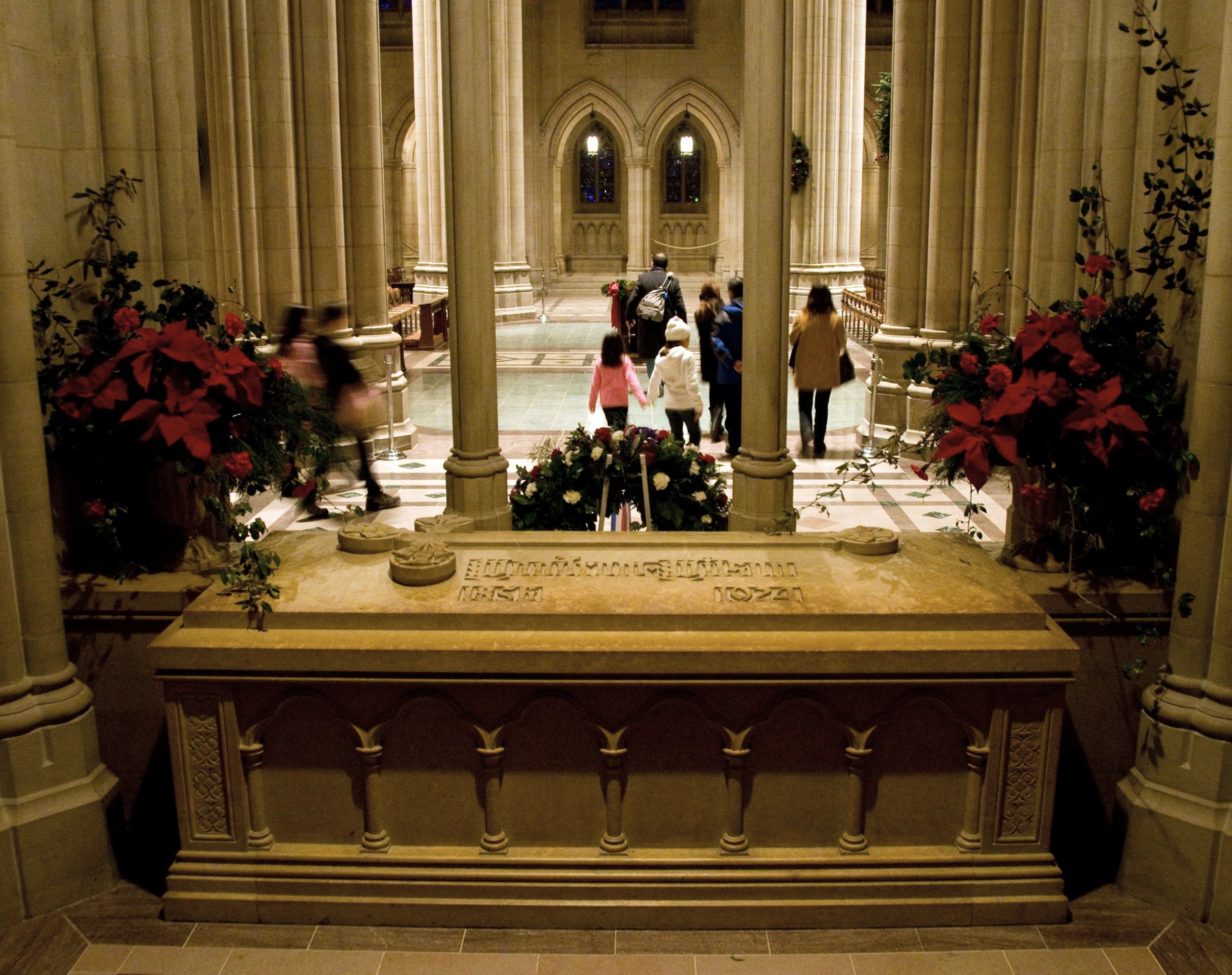
The final resting place of Woodrow Wilson at Washington National Cathedral

After the end of his second term in 1921, Wilson and his wife moved from the White House to a townhouse in the Kalorama section of Washington, D.C. He continued to follow politics as President Harding and the Republican Congress repudiated membership in the League of Nations, cut taxes, and raised tariffs. In 1921, Wilson opened a law practice with former secretary of state Bainbridge Colby. Wilson showed up the first day but never returned, and the practice was closed by the end of 1922. Wilson tried writing, and he produced a few short essays after enormous effort; they "marked a sad finish to a formerly great literary career." He declined to write memoirs, but frequently met with Ray Stannard Baker, who wrote a three-volume biography of Wilson that was published in 1922. In August 1923, Wilson attended the funeral of his successor, Warren Harding. On November 10, 1923, Wilson made his last national address, delivering a short Armistice Day radio speech from the library of his home.

Wilson's health did not markedly improve after leaving office, declining rapidly in January 1924. He died on February 3, 1924, at the age of 67. The president and first lady, Calvin and Grace Coolidge, attended the funeral as did former first lady Florence Harding. Former first lady Helen Herron Taft represented her husband, Chief Justice and former president William Howard Taft, who was too ill to attend the service. Also among the 2,000 guests invited were 11 senators, many members of the House of Representatives, and several foreign dignitaries. Wilson was interred in Washington National Cathedral, being the only president whose final resting place lies within the nation's capital.

During the early Twenties, Wilson collaborated with various associates of his in putting together a draft Democratic platform for the 1924 elections. Known as ‘The Document,’ an early draft was sent by David F. Houston to Wilson on January the 11th 1923 which attacked the Republicans for being “blind to changing social and economic conditions” and failing “to enact legislation to remedy evils which had appeared in many directions.” It called for additional support for farmers by way of additional short term credits and additional aids for marketing products, the development of agencies to improve rural health, and generous care for disabled soldiers and sailors. Wilson sent the final draft of ‘The Document’ on January the 20th 1924 to Newton Diehl Baker; asking for his opinion on whether or not it should be submitted to the Democratic Committee on Resolutions. The final draft attacked the record of both the Republican administration and the Republican-controlled Congress, arguing that the Republican Party “has not enacted a single piece of constructive or ameliorative legislation.” In terms of specific proposals, it called for the establishment of a Secretary of Transportation, encouraging state legislatures to support the efforts of farmers and other producers in setting up and administering cooperative organizations, and the realization “of sober and practical legislative reforms which shall remove the chief provocations to revolution.”

After Wilson’s death, Baker sent a copy to Louis Brandeis stating that he would not send the document to the committee while arguing that he didn’t think anyone “has the right to give these papers to the public as expressive of President Wilson’s views.” According to one observer, “Wilson’s views of radicalism, still using the language of irrationalism, had become increasingly anachronistic as the focus of progressive activity had again become coalitional politics.”

== Race relations ==
Wilson was born and raised in the U.S. South by parents who were committed supporters of both slavery and the Confederacy. Academically, Wilson was an apologist for slavery and the Redeemers, and one of the foremost promoters of the Lost Cause mythology. Wilson was the first Southerner elected president since Zachary Taylor in 1848 and the only former subject of the Confederacy. Wilson's election was celebrated by southern segregationists. At Princeton, Wilson actively discouraged the admission of African-Americans as students. Several historians have spotlighted consistent examples in the public record of Wilson's overtly racist policies and the inclusion of segregationists in his Cabinet. Other scholars say Wilson defended segregation as "a rational, scientific policy" in private and describe him as a man who "loved to tell racist 'darky' jokes about black Americans."

During Wilson's presidency, D. W. Griffith's pro-Ku Klux Klan film The Birth of a Nation (1915) was screened in the White House. Though he was not initially critical of the movie, Wilson distanced himself from it as public backlash mounted and eventually released a statement condemning the film's message while denying he had been aware of it prior to the screening.

=== Segregating the federal bureaucracy ===
By the 1910s, African Americans had become effectively shut out of elected office. Obtaining an executive appointment to a position within the federal bureaucracy was usually the only option for African-American statesmen. According to Berg, Wilson continued to appoint African-Americans to positions that had traditionally been filled by black people, overcoming opposition from many Southern senators. Oswald Garrison Villard, who later became an opponent of his, initially thought that Wilson was not a bigot and supported progress for black people, and he was frustrated by Southern opposition in the Senate, to which Wilson capitulated. In a conversation with Wilson, journalist John Palmer Gavit came to the realization that opposition to those views "would certainly precipitate a conflict which would put a complete stop to any legislative program."

Since the end of Reconstruction, both parties recognized certain appointments as unofficially reserved for qualified African-Americans. Wilson appointed a total of nine African-Americans to prominent positions in the federal bureaucracy, eight of whom were Republican carry-overs. For comparison, William Howard Taft was met with disdain and outrage from Republicans of both races for appointing thirty-one black officeholders, a record low for a Republican president. Upon taking office, Wilson fired all but two of the seventeen black supervisors in the federal bureaucracy appointed by Taft. Since 1863, the U.S. mission to Haiti and Santo Domingo was almost always led by an African American diplomat regardless of what party the sitting president belonged to; Wilson ended this half-century-old tradition but continued to appoint Black diplomats, such as George Washington Buckner, as well as Joseph L. Johnson, to head the mission to Liberia. Since the end of Reconstruction, the federal bureaucracy had been possibly the only career path where African-Americans could experience some measure of equality, and was the lifeblood and foundation of the Black middle class.

Wilson's administration escalated the discriminatory hiring policies and segregation of government offices that had begun under Theodore Roosevelt and continued under Taft. In Wilson's first month in office, Postmaster General Albert S. Burleson urged the president to establish segregated government offices. Wilson did not adopt Burleson's proposal but allowed Cabinet secretaries discretion to segregate their respective departments. By the end of 1913, many departments, including the Navy, Treasury, and Post Office, had segregated work spaces, restrooms, and cafeterias. Many agencies used segregation as a pretext to adopt a whites-only employment policy, claiming they lacked facilities for black workers. In these instances, African-Americans employed prior to the Wilson administration were either offered early retirement, transferred, or simply fired. At the suggestion of Oklahoma Senator Thomas Gore, Wilson nominated Adam E. Patterson, a Black Democrat from Muskogee, Oklahoma, for the position of Register of the Treasury in July 1913; Patterson withdrew his name from consideration following opposition from Southern Democratic senators James K. Vardaman and Benjamin Tillman. Wilson proceeded to nominate Gabe E. Parker, who was of mixed European and Choctaw descent, for the position instead, and did not nominate any other Black people for federal office afterwards.

Racial discrimination in federal hiring increased further when after 1914, the United States Civil Service Commission instituted a new policy requiring job applicants to submit a personal photo with their application. The alleged impetus behind this policy was to guard against applicant fraud; however, only 14 cases of impersonation/attempted impersonation in the application process were uncovered the year prior. As a federal enclave, Washington, D.C., had long offered African Americans greater opportunities for employment and less glaring discrimination. In 1919, Black veterans returning home to D.C. were shocked to discover Jim Crow laws had set in; many could not go back to the jobs they held prior to the war or even enter the same building they used to work in due to the color of their skin. Booker T. Washington described the situation: "I had never seen the colored people so discouraged and bitter as they are at the present time."

=== African Americans in the armed forces ===
While segregation had been present in the Army prior to Wilson, its severity increased significantly under his administration. During Wilson's first term, the Army and Navy refused to commission new black officers. Black officers already serving experienced increased discrimination and were often forced out or discharged on dubious grounds. Following the entry of the U.S. into World War I, the War Department drafted hundreds of thousands of black people into the Army, and draftees were paid equally regardless of race. Commissioning of African-American officers resumed but units remained segregated and most all-black units were led by white officers.

Unlike the Army, the U.S. Navy was never formally segregated. Following Wilson's appointment of Josephus Daniels as Secretary of the Navy, a system of Jim Crow was swiftly implemented; with ships, training facilities, restrooms, and cafeterias all becoming segregated. While Daniels significantly expanded opportunities for advancement and training available to white sailors, by the time the U.S. entered World War I, African-American sailors had been relegated almost entirely to mess and custodial duties, often assigned to act as servants for white officers.

=== Response to racial violence ===
In response to the demand for industrial labor, the Great Migration of African Americans out of the South surged in 1917 and 1918. This migration sparked race riots, including the East St. Louis riots of 1917. In response to these riots, but only after much public outcry, Wilson asked Attorney General Thomas Watt Gregory if the federal government could intervene to "check these disgraceful outrages". On the advice of Gregory, Wilson did not take direct action against the riots. In 1918, Wilson spoke out against lynching in the United States, stating: "I say plainly that every American who takes part in the action of mob or gives it any sort of continence is no true son of this great democracy but its betrayer, and ... [discredits] her by that single disloyalty to her standards of law and of rights."

In 1919, another series of race riots occurred in Chicago, Omaha, and two dozen other major cities in the North. Historians estimate more than 250 African Americans were killed. The federal government did not become involved, just as it had not become involved previously.

== Legacy ==
=== Historical reputation ===
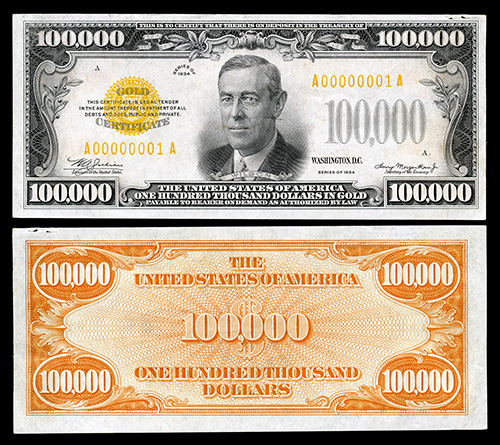
A 1934 $100,000 gold certificate depicting Wilson

Wilson is generally ranked by historians and political scientists as an above average president. In the view of some historians, Wilson, more than any of his predecessors, took steps towards the creation of a strong federal government that would protect ordinary citizens against the overwhelming power of large corporations. He is generally regarded as a key figure in the establishment of modern American liberalism, and a strong influence on future presidents such as Franklin D. Roosevelt and Lyndon B. Johnson. Cooper argues that in terms of impact and ambition, only the New Deal and the Great Society rival the domestic accomplishments of Wilson's presidency. Many of Wilson's accomplishments, including the Federal Reserve, the Federal Trade Commission, the graduated income tax, and labor laws, continued to influence the United States long after Wilson's death.

Many conservatives have attacked Wilson for his role in expanding the federal government. In 2018, conservative columnist George Will wrote in The Washington Post that Theodore Roosevelt and Wilson were the "progenitors of today's imperial presidency". Wilson's foreign policy, which came to be known as Wilsonian idealism, also cast a long shadow over American foreign policy, and Wilson's League of Nations influenced the development of the United Nations. Saladin Ambar writes that Wilson was "the first statesman of world stature to speak out not only against European imperialism but against the newer form of economic domination sometimes described as 'informal imperialism.'"

Notwithstanding his accomplishments in office, Wilson has received criticism for his record on race relations and civil liberties, for his interventions in Latin America, and for his failure to win ratification of the Treaty of Versailles. Despite his Southern roots and record at Princeton, Wilson became the first Democrat to receive widespread support from the African American community in a presidential election. Wilson's African-American supporters, many of whom had crossed party lines to vote for him in 1912, found themselves bitterly disappointed by the Wilson presidency, his decision to allow the imposition of Jim Crow within the federal bureaucracy in particular.

Ross Kennedy writes that Wilson's support of segregation complied with predominant public opinion. A. Scott Berg argues Wilson accepted segregation as part of a policy to "promote racial progress... by shocking the social system as little as possible." The ultimate result of this policy was unprecedented levels of segregation within the federal bureaucracy and far fewer opportunities for employment and promotion being open to African-Americans than before. Historian Kendrick Clements argues "Wilson had none of the crude, vicious racism of James K. Vardaman or Benjamin R. Tillman, but he was insensitive to African-American feelings and aspirations." A 2021 study in the Quarterly Journal of Economics found that Wilson's segregation of the civil service increased the black-white earnings gap by 3.4–6.9 percentage points, as existing black civil servants were driven to lower-paid positions. Black civil servants who were exposed to Wilson's segregationist policies experienced a relative decline in home ownership rates, with suggestive evidence of lasting adverse effects for the descendants of those black civil servants. In the wake of the 2015 Charleston church shooting, some individuals demanded the removal of Wilson's name from institutions affiliated with Princeton due to his stance on race.

=== Memorials ===
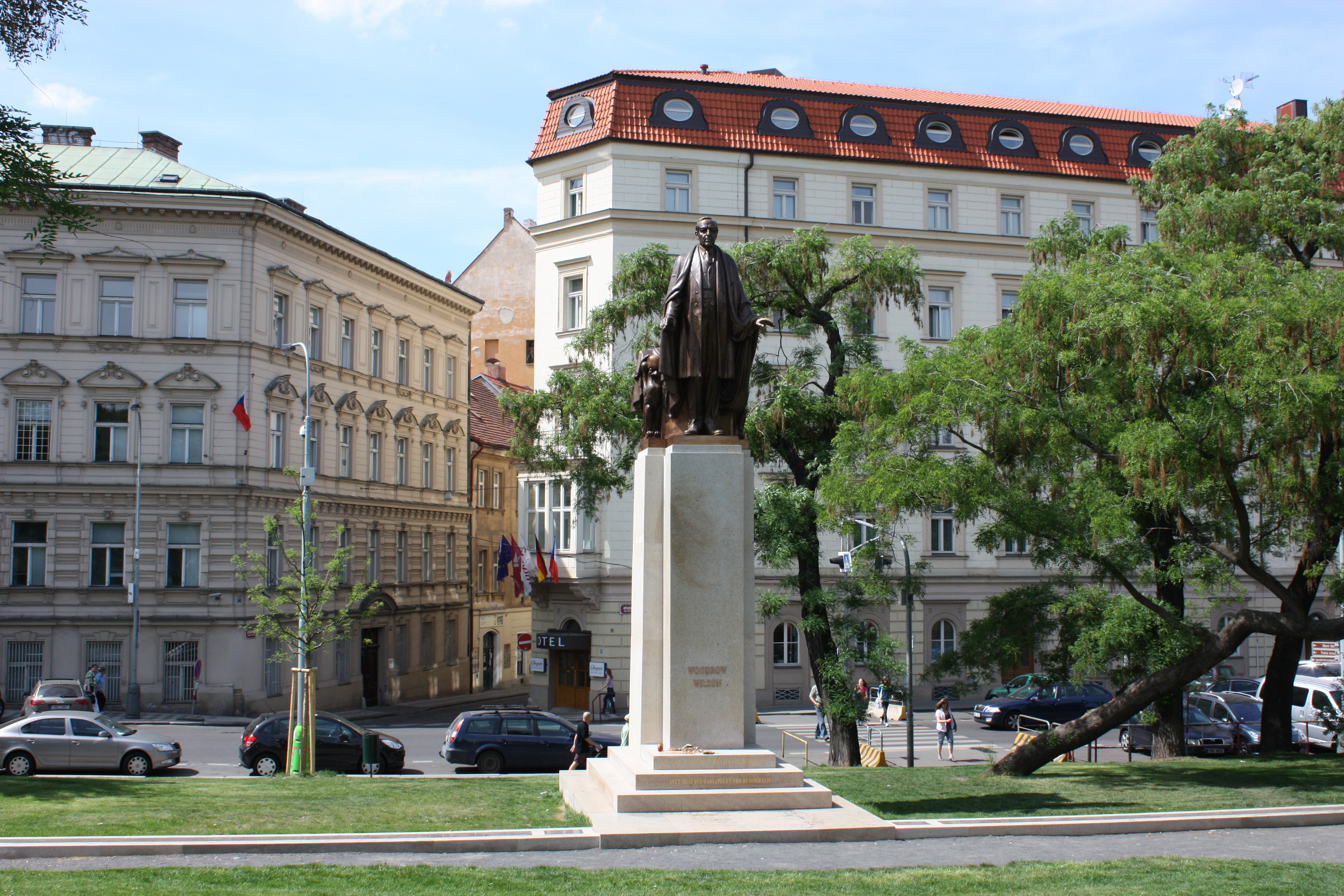
Woodrow Wilson Monument in Prague, Czech Republic

The Woodrow Wilson Presidential Library is located in Staunton, Virginia. The Woodrow Wilson Boyhood Home in Augusta, Georgia, and the Woodrow Wilson House in Washington, D.C., are National Historic Landmarks. The Thomas Woodrow Wilson Boyhood Home in Columbia, South Carolina is listed on the National Register of Historic Places. Shadow Lawn, the Summer White House for Wilson during his term in office, became part of Monmouth University in 1956, and was declared a National Historic Landmark in 1985. Prospect House in Princeton, New Jersey, Wilson's residence as president of Princeton University, has been named a National Historic Landmark. Wilson's presidential papers and his personal library are housed in the Library of Congress.

The Woodrow Wilson International Center for Scholars in Washington, D.C., is named for Wilson, and the Princeton School of Public and International Affairs at Princeton University was named for Wilson until 2020 when Princeton's board of trustees voted to remove Wilson's name from the school. The Woodrow Wilson National Fellowship Foundation is a non-profit that provides grants for teaching fellowships. The Woodrow Wilson Foundation was established to honor Wilson's legacy but was terminated in 1993. One of Princeton University's six residential colleges was originally named Wilson College. Numerous schools, including several high schools, bear Wilson's name. Several streets, including the Rambla Presidente Wilson in Montevideo, Uruguay, have been named for Wilson. The USS Woodrow Wilson, a Lafayette-class submarine, was named for Wilson. Other things named for Wilson include the Woodrow Wilson Bridge between Prince George's County, Maryland and Virginia, and the Palais Wilson, which serves as the temporary headquarters of the Office of the United Nations High Commissioner for Human Rights in Geneva until 2023 at the end of leasing. Monuments to Wilson include the Woodrow Wilson Monument in Prague.

=== Popular culture ===
In 1944, 20th Century Fox released Wilson, a biopic about Wilson starring Alexander Knox and directed by Henry King, considered an "idealistic" portrayal of Wilson. The movie was a personal passion project of studio president and producer Darryl F. Zanuck, who was a deep admirer of Wilson. The movie was praised by film critics and Wilson supporters, and scored ten Academy Awards nominations, winning five. Despite its popularity amongst elites, Wilson was a box-office bomb, incurring an almost $2 million loss for the studio. The movie's failure is said to have had a deep and long-lasting impact on Zanuck and no attempt has been made by any major studio since to create a motion picture based on the life of Wilson.

== Works ==
- Congressional Government: A Study in American Politics. Boston: Houghton, Mifflin, 1885.
- The State: Elements of Historical and Practical Politics. Boston: D.C. Heath, 1889.
- Division and Reunion, 1829–1889. New York, London, Longmans, Green, and Co., 1893.
- An old master, and other political essaysAn Old Master and Other Political Essays.] New York: Charles Scribner's Sons, 1893.
- Mere Literature and Other Essays. Boston: Houghton Mifflin, 1896.
- George Washington. New York: Harper & Brothers, 1897.
- A History of the American People. In five volumes. New York: Harper & Brothers, 1901–02. Vol. 1 | Vol. 2 | Vol. 3 | Vol. 4 | Vol. 5
- Constitutional Government in the United States. New York: Columbia University Press, 1908.
- The Free Life: A Baccalaureate Address. New York: Thomas Y. Crowell & Co., 1908.
- The New Freedom: A Call for the Emancipation of the Energies of a Generous People. New York: Doubleday, Page & Co., 1913. —Speeches
- The Road Away from Revolution. Boston: Atlantic Monthly Press, 1923; reprint of short magazine article.
- The Public Papers of Woodrow Wilson. Ray Stannard Baker and William E. Dodd (eds.) In six volumes. New York: Harper & Brothers, 1925–27.
- Study of public administration (Washington: Public Affairs Press, 1955)
- A Crossroads of Freedom: The 1912 Campaign Speeches of Woodrow Wilson. John Wells Davidson (ed.) New Haven, CT: Yale University Press, 1956.online
- The Papers of Woodrow Wilson. Arthur S. Link (ed.) In 69 volumes. Princeton, NJ: Princeton University Press, 1967–1994.

== See also ==
- Diplomatic history of World War I
- Electoral history of Woodrow Wilson
- List of photographs of Woodrow Wilson
- List of presidents of the United States
- List of presidents of the United States by previous experience
- List of United States Democratic Party presidential tickets
- Progressive Era
- Woodrow Wilson Awards

== Bibliography ==
- Auchincloss, Louis (2000). Woodrow Wilson. Viking. ISBN 978-0-670-88904-4.
- Avrich, Paul (1991). Sacco and Vanzetti: The Anarchist Background. Princeton University Press. ISBN 978-0-691-02604-6.
- Berg, A. Scott (2013). Wilson. Simon & Schuster. ISBN 978-0-7432-0675-4.
- Bimes, Terry; Skowronek, Stephen (1996). "Woodrow Wilson's Critique of Popular Leadership: Reassessing the Modern-Traditional Divide in Presidential History". Polity. 29 (1): 27–63. doi:10.2307/3235274. JSTOR 3235274. S2CID 147062744.
- Blum, John (1956). Woodrow Wilson and the Politics of Morality. Little, Brown. ISBN 978-0-316-10021-2.
- Bragdon, Henry W. (1967). Woodrow Wilson: the Academic Years. Belknap Press. ISBN 978-0-674-73395-4.
- Brands, H. W. (2003). Woodrow Wilson. Times Books. ISBN 978-0-8050-6955-6.
- Chun, Kwang-Ho (2011). "Kosovo: A New European Nation-State?" (PDF). Journal of International and Area Studies. 18 (1): 94.
- Clements, Kendrick A. (1992). The Presidency of Woodrow Wilson. University Press of Kansas. ISBN 978-0-7006-0523-1.
- Coben, Stanley. A. Mitchell Palmer: Politician (Columbia UP, 1963) online
- Cooper, John Milton Jr., ed. (2008). Reconsidering Woodrow Wilson: Progressivism, Internationalism, War, and Peace. Woodrow Wilson Center Press. ISBN 978-0-8018-9074-1.
- Cooper, John Milton Jr. (1983), The Warrior and the Priest: Woodrow Wilson and Theodore Roosevelt, Belknap Press, ISBN 978-0-674-94750-4
- Cooper, John Milton Jr. (2009). Woodrow Wilson. Knopf Doubleday Publishing Group. ISBN 9780307273017.
- Gould, Lewis L. (2008). Four Hats in the Ring: the 1912 Election and the Birth of Modern American Politics. University Press of Kansas. ISBN 978-0-7006-1856-9.
- Gould, Lewis L. (2003). Grand Old Party: A History of the Republicans. Random House. ISBN 978-0-375-50741-0.
- Hankins, Barry (2016). Woodrow Wilson: Ruling Elder, Spiritual President. Oxford University Press. ISBN 978-0-19-102818-2.
- Heckscher, August, ed. (1956). The Politics of Woodrow Wilson: Selections from his Speeches and Writings. Harper. OCLC 564752499.
- Heckscher, August (1991). Woodrow Wilson. Easton Press. ISBN 978-0-684-19312-0.
- Herring, George C. (2008). From Colony to Superpower: U.S. Foreign Relations since 1776. Oxford University Press. ISBN 978-0-19-972343-0.
- Kane, Joseph (1993). Facts about the Presidents: A Compilation of Biographical and Historical Information. New York: H. W. Wilson. ISBN 0-8242-0845-5.
- Kennedy, Ross A., ed. (2013). A Companion to Woodrow Wilson. John Wiley & Sons. ISBN 978-1-118-44540-2.
- Levin, Phyllis Lee (2001). Edith and Woodrow: The Wilson White House. Scribner. ISBN 978-0-7432-1158-1.
- Link, Arthur Stanley (1947–1965), Wilson, vol. 5 volumes, Princeton University Press, OCLC 3660132
  - Link, Arthur Stanley (1947). Wilson: The Road to the White House. Princeton University Press.
  - Link, Arthur Stanley (1956). Wilson: The New Freedom. Princeton University Press.
  - Link, Arthur Stanley (1960). Wilson: The Struggle for Neutrality: 1914–1915. Princeton University Press.
  - Link, Arthur Stanley (1964). Wilson: Confusions and Crises: 1915–1916. Princeton University Press.
  - Link, Arthur Stanley (1965). Wilson: Campaigns for Progressivism and Peace: 1916–1917. Princeton University Press.
- Link, Arthur Stanley (2002). "Woodrow Wilson". In Graff, Henry F. (ed.). The Presidents: A Reference History. Scribner. pp. 365–388. ISBN 978-0-684-31226-2.
- Mulder, John H. (1978). Woodrow Wilson: The Years of Preparation. Princeton University Press. ISBN 978-0-691-04647-1.
- Ober, William B (1983). "Woodrow Wilson: A Medical and Psychological Biography". Bulletin of the New York Academy of Medicine. 59 (4): 410–414. PMC 1911642.
- O'Toole, Patricia (2018). The Moralist: Woodrow Wilson and the World He Made. Simon & Schuster. ISBN 978-0-7432-9809-4.
- Pestritto, Ronald J. (2005). Woodrow Wilson and the Roots of Modern Liberalism. Rowman & Littlefield. ISBN 978-0-7425-1517-8.
- Ruiz, George W. (1989). "The Ideological Convergence of Theodore Roosevelt and Woodrow Wilson". Presidential Studies Quarterly. 19 (1): 159–177. JSTOR 40574572.
- Saunders, Robert M. (1998). In Search of Woodrow Wilson: Beliefs and Behavior. Greenwood Press. ISBN 978-0-313-30520-7.
- Stokes, Melvyn (2007). D. W. Griffith's The Birth of a Nation: A History of "The Most Controversial Motion Picture of All Time". Oxford University Press. ISBN 978-0-19-533679-5.
- Walworth, Arthur (1958). Woodrow Wilson, Volume I, Volume II. Longmans, Green. OCLC 1031728326.
- Weisman, Steven R. (2002). The Great Tax Wars: Lincoln to Wilson – The Fierce Battles over Money That Transformed the Nation. Simon & Schuster. ISBN 978-0-684-85068-9.
- White, William Allen (2007) [1925]. Woodrow Wilson – The Man, His Times and His Task. Read Books. ISBN 978-1-4067-7685-0.
- Wilson, Woodrow (1885). Congressional Government, A Study in American Politics. Houghton, Mifflin and Company. OCLC 504641398 – via Internet Archive.
- Wright, Esmond. "The Foreign Policy of Woodrow Wilson: A Re-Assessment. Part 1: Woodrow Wilson and the First World War" History Today. (Mar 1960) 10#3 pp. 149–157.
  - Wright, Esmond. "The Foreign Policy of Woodrow Wilson: A Re-Assessment. Part 2: Wilson and the Dream of Reason" History Today (Apr 1960) 19#4 pp. 223–231.

Academic offices
Preceded by Francis Landey Patton	President of Princeton University; 1902–1910	Succeeded by John Aikman Stewart acting
Party political offices
Preceded by Frank S. Katzenbach	Democratic nominee for Governor of New Jersey; 1910	Succeeded by James Fairman Fielder
Preceded by William Jennings Bryan	Democratic nominee for President of the United States; 1912, 1916	Succeeded by James M. Cox
Political offices
Preceded by John Franklin Fort	Governor of New Jersey; 1911–1913	Succeeded by James Fairman Fielder acting
Preceded by William Howard Taft	President of the United States; 1913–1921	Succeeded by Warren G. Harding
Awards and achievements
Preceded by International Committee of the Red Cross	Laureate of the Nobel Peace Prize; 1919	Succeeded by Léon Bourgeois
Preceded by Giulio Gatti-Casazza	Cover of Time; November 12, 1923	Succeeded by Erich Ludendorff
