= Nancy C. Unger =

American history professor and author

Nancy C. Unger is an American history professor and author. She is a professor emerita at Santa Clara University. She has written books on American progressives in the environmental movement, Bob La Follette, and Belle La Follette.

She was born in Seattle and graduated from Gonzaga University in 1978. She received her masters and Ph.D. from the University of Southern California.

She discussed Bob La Follette on PBS North Carolina.

Unger suggested that Belle La Follette should appear on a newly designed $10 bill. She supports a California law requiring the teaching of LGBT history in public schools.

== Selected works ==
- Fighting Bob La Follette: The Righteous Reformer
- Belle La Follette: Progressive Era Reformer
- Beyond Nature's Housekeepers: American Women in Environmental History
- A Companion to the Gilded Age and Progressive Era, co-editor with Christopher McKnight Nichols
