= Lynn D. Salvage =

American banker

Lynn D. Salvage (born June 6, 1946) is an American banker and businesswoman who at the age of 30 became the second president of the First Women's Bank of New York in 1977 after serving as vice president at Bankers Trust Company and as special assistant for international affairs at the U.S. Department of the Treasury. Salvage was also one of four Harvard Business School graduates who initiated a two-year campaign beginning in 1970 to admit women as full members to the Harvard Club of New York City.

== Family and education ==
Lynn D. Salvage was born to Edward and Rita Salvage on June 6, 1946 in New York City. Her mother's family was of Czech ancestry; her maternal grandfather, Arthur Hoffman, had been a professor of mathematics and economics at universities in Prague and Pilsen. Salvage attended Long Beach High School on Long Island and went on to study comparative literature at University of Pennsylvania where she earned her undergraduate degree. She received a graduate degree from Harvard Business School. Salvage is multi-lingual with fluency in French and German, and also claims a basic understanding of Spanish, Arabic, and Russian.

Salvage married investment banker Donald R. Kaplan in the Memorial Chapel at Harvard University in 1979.

== Career ==
After graduating from Harvard Business School, Salvage pursued a career in banking in New York City. In her five years at Bankers Trust Company she rose to the position of vice president and was a manager of international investments. She also spent a year in Washington D.C. working as a special assistant in international affairs in the U.S. Department of the Treasury through an executive exchange program.

In February of 1977, Salvage became the president of the First Women's Bank of New York, a women-owned and operated bank that opened in 1975 to address the needs of women who had faced barriers to credit and financial services in from traditional banks. She succeeded the bank's founding president Madeline McWhinney Dale. The bank had not reported a profit since its opening and Salvage took on the challenge of turning the bank around by streamlining its operations and growing its deposits. Like her predecessor, Salvage had to balance the bank's mission to financially empower women with sound business practices and fiduciary responsibility to the bank's 7,000 shareholders who were largely women. At the beginning of her tenure Salvage stated "The best service this bank can do the cause of female equality is make some money."

Under Salvage's leadership the First Women's Bank was able to post modest profits in 1978 and 1979. However, Salvage chose not to continue with the bank when her contract came up for renewal at the end of 1979. Instead, Salvage pursued opportunities outside of the financial industry and became president and CEO of the Katharine Gibbs School in 1980. A wealthy society matron, Katharine Gibbs established her school in 1911 to train women to become executive secretaries and become competitive in a role that had been seen as the domain of men. Motivated by Gibbs original mission, Salvage wanted to transform secretarial roles by training students on the emerging office technologies that were pointing to a paperless office. However, her time at the school was short and she resigned in 1981.

== Involvement in the women's movement ==
While Salvage did not formally align herself with the women's movement during the 1970s and 80s, she was active in women's organizations including the Harvard Businesswomen of New York and the YWCA, and was recognized by the American Federation of Women's Clubs as one of the outstanding women in America in 1974.

In 1970, Salvage was one of four women graduates of Harvard Business School who publicly campaigned for the Harvard Club of New York City to change its policies to allow women full membership and access to the main dining room.

In 1979, the supersisters trading card set was produced and distributed; Salvage was featured in the set in her role as the president of the First Women's Bank.
