= Supersisters =

American trading cards of prominent women (1979)

Front and back of card #38, Shari Lewis

Supersisters was a set of 72 trading cards produced and distributed in the United States in 1979 by Supersisters, Inc. They featured famous women from politics, media and entertainment, culture, sports, and other areas of achievement. The cards were designed in response to the trading cards popular among children in the US at the time, which mostly featured men.

The cards were created by Lois Rich of Irvington, New York and her sister Barbara Egerman of Ridgefield, Connecticut, a teacher, librarian, and founder of the Ohio chapter of the National Organization for Women. They conceived of the cards in 1978, after Rich's young daughter asked her why there were no women on trading cards. Rich also discovered that students at a local elementary school could not name five famous women. Rich and Egerman received a small grant from the New York State Education Department and wrote to nearly 500 prominent American women in various fields. They purposely did not contact a number of notable women, including Anita Bryant, Angela Davis, Phyllis Schlafly, and the cast of Charlie's Angels. Jane Fonda, Betty Ford, Rosalynn Carter, and Ella T. Grasso were among those who did not respond or declined to participate. Of those who did respond, they included the first 72 in the trading card set, including Jane Pauley, Margaret Mead, and Gloria Steinem. By 1981, they reported that they had sold 15,000 trading card sets, selling many to schools and colleges.

Reaction to the cards was largely positive, though some later critics called the cards "misguided" and "trivial". Sets of the trading cards are in the collections of the Museum of Modern Art and the University of Iowa library.

Card #	Name	Occupation
1	Suzy Chaffee	Olympic skier
2	Nancy Dickerson	journalist
3	Pat Schroeder	US Congresswoman
4	Margaret Chase Smith	US Senator
5	Lynn D. Salvage	banker
6	Sally J. Priesand	rabbi
7	Letty Cottin Pogrebin	author
8	Bella S. Abzug	US Congresswoman
9	Helen Reddy	singer
10	Lois Gould	author
11	Sonia Manzano	actress
12	Helen Thomas	journalist
13	Virginia Hamilton	author
14	Carla Anderson Hills	lawyer, US cabinet level secretary
15	Mary Louise Smith	chair of Republican National Committee
16	Margaret Mead	anthropologist
17	Wendy Boglioli	Olympic swimmer
18	Julie Harris	actress
19	Rosie Casals	tennis player
20	Elly Peterson	politician
21	Mary Rose Oakar	US Congresswoman
22	Linda Winikow	New York State Senator
23	Lucinda Franks	journalist
24	Bonnie Tiburzi	First female pilot to fly for a major U.S. airline.
25	Leonor K. Sullivan	US Congresswoman
26	Caroline Bird	author
27	Rosa Parks	civil rights pioneer
28	Helen Stevenson Meyner	US Congresswoman
29	Doriot Anthony Dwyer	flautist
30	Lindy Cochran	skier
31	Maxine Kumin	poet
32	Gloria Steinem	author
33	Gladys Noon Spellman	US Congresswoman
34	Malvina Reynolds	singer-songwriter
35	Eleanor Cutri Smeal	National Organization for Women president
36	Ann Carr	gymnast
37	Laura Lee Ching	surfer
38	Shari Lewis	entertainer
39	Barbara A. Mikulski	US Congresswoman
40	Meredith Monk	composer and choreographer
41	Barbara Gardner Proctor	advertising
42	Katharine Graham	newspaper publisher
43	Ruby Dee	actress
44	Marlo Thomas	actress
45	Kathrine Switzer	author, runner
46	Miki Gorman	runner
47	Barbara Ann Cochran	Olympic skier
48	Wendy Turnbull	tennis player
49	Shirley M. Hufstedler	federal judge, US cabinet level secretary
50	Kathy Johnson	gymnast
51	Claudia Weill	film director
52	Jane Pauley	journalist
53	Janet Guthrie	race car driver
54	Debbie Gary Callier	pilot
55	Jane Alexander	actress
56	Jane Trahey	advertising
57	Jane Cahill Pfeiffer	television executive
58	Cindy Nelson	skier
59	Rhonda Schwandt	gymnast
60	Jane Bryant Quinn	journalist
61	Sarah Weddington	lawyer
62	Robin Morgan	author
63	Jackie Cassello	gymnast
64	Cathy Rigby Mason	Olympic gymnast
65	Melanie Smith	Olympic equestrian
66	Buffy Sainte-Marie	singer
67	Natalie Dunn	roller skater
68	Cathy Carr	Olympic swimmer
69	Leslie Uggams	actress
70	Helen Hayes	actress
71	Shirley Chisholm	US Congresswoman
72	Ntozake Shange	poet
