= Jane Cahill Pfeiffer =

American executive (1932–2019)

- Born: Jane Pennington Cahill; September 29, 1932; Washington, D.C., U.S.
- Died: March 5, 2019 (aged 86); Vero Beach, Florida, U.S.
- Education: University of Maryland (BA)
- Occupation: Business executive
- Employers: IBM; NBC

Jane Cahill Pfeiffer (September 29, 1932 – March 5, 2019), was an American executive. Pfeiffer was the first chairwoman of the National Broadcasting Company (NBC) between 1978 and 1980.

== Early life ==
On September 29, 1932, Pfeiffer was born as Jane Pennington Cahill in Washington, D.C.

== Education ==
Pfeiffer earned a B.A. in speech and drama from the University of Maryland in 1954. From 1956 to 1957 she undertook graduate courses in philosophy at Georgetown University and Catholic University.

== Career ==
Pfeiffer entered a novitiate to become a Roman Catholic nun, leaving after six months.

Pfeiffer started her career at IBM as a systems engineer trainee.

In 1966, Pfeiffer was appointed by President Lyndon B. Johnson to serve as the first female White House fellow, until 1967. Pfeiffer worked with Robert Wood, undersecretary of the Department of Housing and Urban Development, on streamlining the Housing and Home Finance Agency.

Pfeiffer was a vice president of IBM.

Pfeiffer was an executive at NBC. Pfeiffer solved an internal criminal scandal, reduced the NBC board of directors from eighteen to nine members, and reorganized the news division. However, her staff found that her memos were arrogant, that she did not delegate responsibility, and they disliked her wholesale replacements in the finance, personnel, and technical areas.

In 1979, Pfeiffer became the first female chair of NBC, a job she held until 1980. Pfeiffer resigned in 1980.

== Original "Supersister" ==
In 1979, the Supersisters trading card set was produced and distributed; one of the cards featured Pfeiffer's name and picture.

== Personal life ==
On March 5, 2019, Pfeiffer died in Vero Beach, Florida.
