= First Lady from Plains =

1984 book

- Author: Rosalynn Carter
- Language: English
- Publication date: 1984
- Publication place: United States
- ISBN: 9780395352946
- Dewey Decimal: 973.9260924
- LC Class: E874 .C434

First Lady from Plains is a 1984 autobiography by Rosalynn Carter, who served as First Lady of the United States from 1977 to 1981 as her husband, Jimmy Carter, was President of the United States. It is divided into 12 chapters. The book was generally well received by critics, who particularly praised its "intimacy".

== Background ==
Rosalynn Carter was First Lady of the United States from 1977 to 1981 while her husband, Jimmy Carter, was President of the United States. She was born near Plains, Georgia, in 1927 and grew up on the family farm, leaving to attend Georgia Southwestern State University. She married Jimmy Carter in 1946. Rosalynn helped her husband in his presidential campaign, becoming nicknamed the "steel magnolia" for her discipline. As first lady, she focused on mental health issues, the elderly, passage of the Equal Rights Amendment, and functioned as a goodwill ambassador to Latin American nations. She wrote her memoir with help from Linda Bird Francke, a former writer for Newsweek. It was published by Houghton Mifflin and the first edition was 370 pages and divided into 12 chapters covering her life from birth to the 1980 United States presidential election. First Lady from Plains outsold Jimmy Carter's memoir, Keeping Faith.

== Reception ==
Gaddis Smith reviewed the book for the journal Foreign Affairs and wrote that "These earnest, well-constructed memoirs depict a determined and informed politician who played a significant role as her husband's closest adviser". In The Globe and Mail, Ruth Clements felt that "Rosalynn Carter emerges from these memoirs as a very likeable woman" and Phil Gailey in The New York Times considered the account useful in understanding Jimmy Carter, calling it "intimate". Gailey continued to say that the book was "readable, lively and revealing" and was possibly the "best human account" of Carter's presidency. A reviewer in The Boston Globe agreed, praising the book's intimacy and describing Rosalynn's story as "truly an American success story". Commentary noted that the book had a "dreamy, cinematic quality" in parts because it described events in the present tense.

== See also ==
- List of memoirs by first ladies of the United States
