= Everything to Gain: Making the Most of the Rest of Your Life =

1987 memoir by Jimmy and Rosalynn Carter

- Author: Jimmy Carter, Rosalynn Carter
- Language: English
- Genre: Memoir
- Publication date: 1987
- Publication place: United States
- ISBN: 9780394558585
- Dewey Decimal: 158.1
- LC Class: E873.2 .C375

Everything to Gain: Making the Most of the Rest of Your Life is a 1987 memoir co-written by Jimmy Carter, the 39th president of the United States, and his wife, Rosalynn Carter. The Washington Post described it as "a curious production, half memoir and half self-help book", and concluded that much of the advice was not unique to the book, saying it raised the question "Was this book really necessary?"
