= Barbara Gardner Proctor =

American advertising executive (1932–2018)

- Photographed in 1974
- Born: Barbara Juanita Gardner; November 30, 1932; Black Mountain, North Carolina
- Died: December 19, 2018 (aged 86); Chicago, Illinois
- Known for: First African-American Woman who owned and operated an advertising agency

Barbara Juanita Gardner Proctor (November 30, 1932 – December 19, 2018) was an American advertising executive. In 1970 she founded Proctor and Gardner Advertising, Inc.

In 1976, she was advertising person on the year. She was the first African American woman to own and operate an advertising agency. In 1986 her success was being quoted by Ronald Reagan and the Smithsonian.

== Career ==
=== Early life and career ===
Born in Black Mountain, North Carolina in 1932, Gardner was mainly raised by her grandmother. She attended high school in Asheville, NC and studied at Talladega College, Alabama graduating after three years with a degree in English and education and, a year later, in 1954, she gained a further degree in psychology and sociology.

Her earliest occupations were in teaching, counseling and social work. After forming a friendship with Sid McCoy, a Chicago-based disc jockey whose family owned a record store in the city, she was hired by VeeJay Records, with which McCoy was also connected, on his recommendation. She wrote publicity material for the company and liner notes for its album releases. She was the only African American woman working in such a position in the music industry at that time. In the early part of her career (as Barbara J. Gardner), she was a freelance jazz critic writing for DownBeat magazine; she later joined the staff and became a contributing editor.

Meanwhile, around 1960, Gardner became director of VeeJay Records' International Division. In this role, Gardner brought The Beatles to the United States in December 1962 for the first time. VeeJay was responsible for releasing The Beatles earliest records in the United States, via a deal in early 1963 which Gardner made with EMI executives in London.

=== Career in advertising ===
In 1964, she was hired by the Post-Keyes-Gardner Agency, where she began using her married name Proctor so as to not share a name with one of the agency partners. She won 21 awards in three years at that agency. In 1969, she worked at Gene Taylor Associates as a copy supervisor, and later that year worked at North in a similar position. But she thought that at North she was limited to dealing with beauty and household products, and that the company focused on pleasing the customer rather than selling the product. She was fired from North for refusing to work on an advertising campaign for a hair care product which she felt demeaned the Civil rights movement. Gardner Proctor recalled in an interview for C-SPAN: "they wanted me to do a ‘foam-in’ demonstration in the streets, with women running down the streets waving hair spray cans. I said I would never do that."

Therefore, she began her own advertising agency in 1970, called Proctor and Gardner Advertising, Inc. using her own name and her married name assisted by a loan from the Small Business Administration. Her 1960 marriage to Carl Proctor had ended in divorce in 1963, but she used this form to overcome any chauvinism from potential clients. It quickly became the second largest African American advertisement agency in the United States.

In 1995, the company filed for bankruptcy.

== Awards ==
In 1974, she was named the Chicago Advertising Woman of the Year by the Woman's Ad Club, and chosen as "Advertising Person of the Year" by the sixth district of the American Advertising Federation the following year. In 1976, she was elected as the first African-American women to head the Cosmopolitan Chamber of Commerce. She was the president of the National League of Black Women from 1978 to 1982. In 1979, the Supersisters trading card set was produced and distributed; one of the cards featured her name and picture. She received the 1980 Headliner Award from the Association for Women in Communications. From 1983 to 1984, she was the cochair of the Gannon-Proctor Commission, which was appointed by the governor of Illinois to study the economy of Illinois. She was cited by President Ronald Reagan in his State of the Union address, and was included in his 1986 special report "Risk to Riches: Women and Entrepreneurship in America." The Smithsonian Institution also featured her in its "Black Women Achievement against the Odds Hall of Fame.

Gardner Proctor died in a Chicago rehabilitation center on December 19, 2018, shortly after a fall caused a broken hip. She had suffered from dementia for some years.
