= Madeline McWhinney Dale =

American economist and banker

Madeline McWhinney Dale (March 11, 1922 – June 19, 2020) was an American economist and banker who became the first female officer of the Federal Reserve Bank. After a 30-year-career with the Federal Reserve, McWhinney Dale assumed leadership roles within a wide range of organizations including president of the First Women's Bank of New York City, member of the New Jersey State Casino Control Commission, chief financial officer of the Whitney Museum of American Art, governor the American Stock Exchange, chairman of the Charles F. Kettering Foundation, and board member of the Atlantic Energy Corporation and Carnegie Corporation.

== Personal life and family ==
Born Madeline Houston McWhinney in Denver, Colorado on March 11, 1922, she was the first of seven children born to Leroy McWhinney and Alice Barse Houston. Her father was an attorney and president of the International Trust Company, a Denver bank, and her mother was a graduate of Smith College.

McWhinney Dale's father died in a car accident when she was seventeen in 1938. She graduated magna cum laude with economics degree at Smith College in 1943 and earned an M.B.A. at New York University in 1947.

She married John D. Dale in 1961. Together they had one son, Thomas D. Dale.

McWhinney Dale had a long career and life. After retirement, she remained an active member of her community in Red Bank, New Jersey. Her husband, John D. Dale, died in 1993. McWhinney Dale died at home at age 98 on June 19, 2020.

== Banking career ==
McWhinney Dale began working for the Federal Reserve Bank in 1943 benefiting from vacancies created by male workers who left employment to join the military during World War II. To be competitive in the male-dominated banking industry, she made a point of “doing all the things that the men didn’t want to do.” She became the first female officer at the Federal Reserve Bank in 1960 through her specialization in computer technology and electronic communications. As chief officer of the newly formed Market Research Department, her office used computers to monitor the government securities market. She was also the first female trustee of the Federal Reserve Retirement System and notably became the first woman to take on the role of assistant vice president at the bank in 1967.

In November 1973, McWhinney Dale was recruited to be the founding president of the First Woman's Bank of New York, the first full-service bank in the United States that was majority owned and operated by women. Women's banks and credit unions supported feminist movement efforts to achieve equality for women in employment, education, access to financial services and credit, and leadership in business and government. While McWhinney Dale firmly stated that the bank needed to be guided by sound fiscal practice, she also saw the potential of investing in women noting the growing number of women in the workforce and the need through divorce or otherwise for women to have an independent financial identity. Under McWhinney Dale's leadership the First Women's Bank established a library for consumers and education programs that included counseling on investment, insurance, and financial planning.

McWhinney Dale resigned from the First Women's Bank in 1976 unhappy with ongoing conflicts between running a financially successful bank and with the feminist mission of some board members.

McWhinney Dale was a director of the Central Savings Bank of New York and an advisory board member of the Banking Law Review.

== Executive leadership ==
McWhinney Dale's solid reputation within the financial community resulted in multiple opportunities to provide executive leadership and serve on corporate boards. She sat on the board of the Carnegie Corporation and the Atlantic Energy Corporation, was a trustee and chairman of the Charles F. Kettering Foundation, a life trustee and treasurer of the Institute for International Education, and governor of the American Stock Exchange.

She also served as vice president of Phi Beta Kappa Associates and was an active alumnus of New York University and member of its advisory board.

Beginning in 1980, McWhinney Dale served on the State of New Jersey's Casino Control Commission, the entity established to regulate legal gambling as part of the redevelopment of Atlantic City. Her experience working with the Casino Control Commission later led to work on the Advisory Committee on Professional Ethics of the New Jersey Supreme Court.

In 1983, McWhinney Dale became the chief financial officer for the Whitney Museum of American Art.
