= Rosalynn Carter =

First Lady of the United States from 1977 to 1981

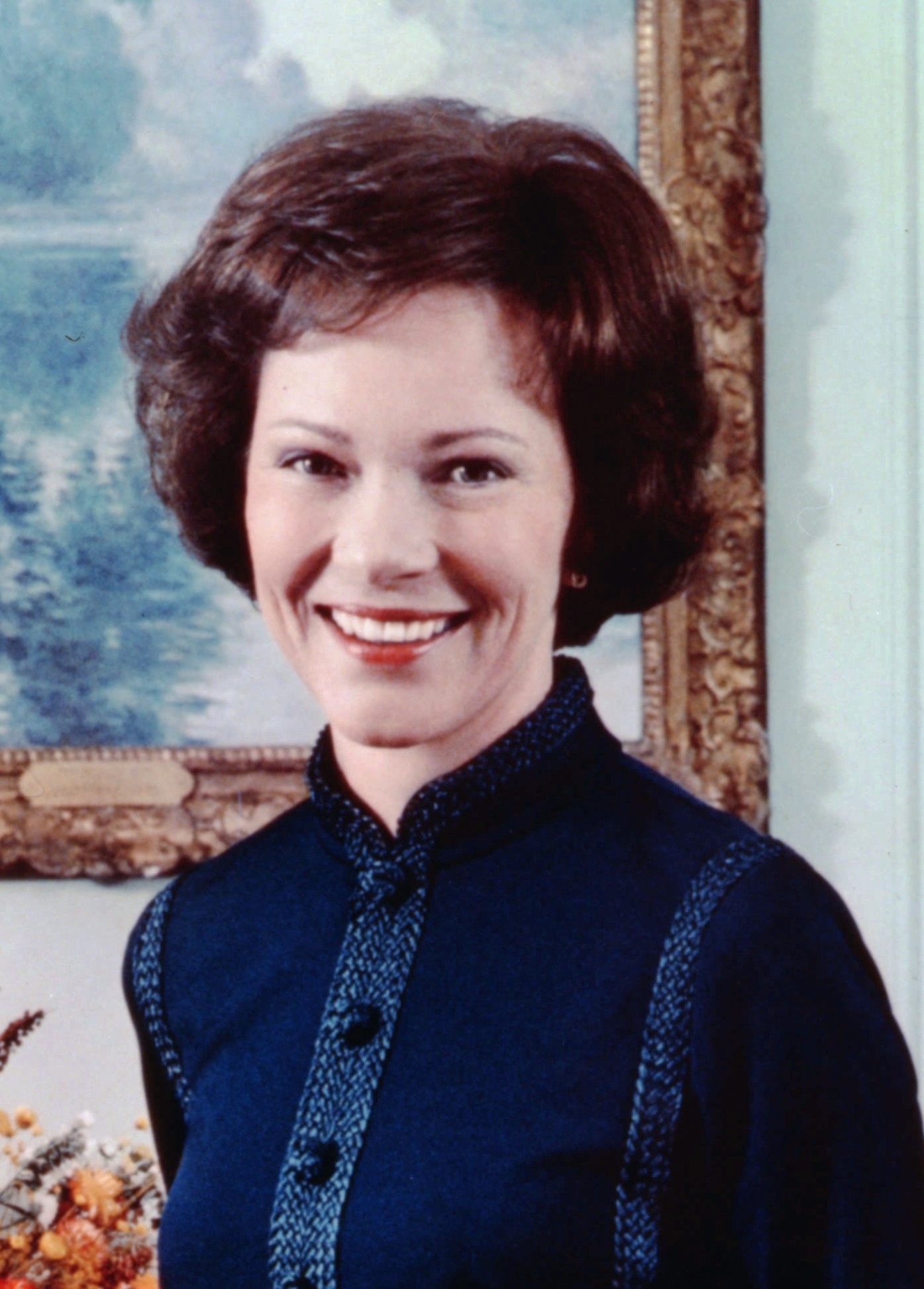
- Official portrait, 1977

First Lady of the United States
- In role January 20, 1977 – January 20, 1981
- President: Jimmy Carter
- Preceded by: Betty Ford
- Succeeded by: Nancy Reagan

First Lady of Georgia
- In role January 12, 1971 – January 14, 1975
- Governor: Jimmy Carter
- Preceded by: Hattie Cox
- Succeeded by: Mary Busbee

Personal details
- Born: Eleanor Rosalynn Smith; August 18, 1927 Plains, Georgia, U.S.
- Died: November 19, 2023 (aged 96) Plains, Georgia, U.S.
- Resting place: Jimmy Carter House, Plains
- Party: Democratic
- Spouse: Jimmy Carter (m. 1946)
- Children: 4, including Jack and Amy
- Education: Georgia Southwestern College
- Awards: Presidential Medal of Freedom

Eleanor Rosalynn Carter (/ˈroʊzəlɪn/ ROH-zə-lin; née Smith; August 18, 1927 – November 19, 2023) was an American activist and humanitarian who served as the first lady of the United States from 1977 to 1981, as the wife of President Jimmy Carter, from their marriage in 1946 until her death in 2023. Throughout her decades of public service, she was a leading advocate for women's rights and mental health.

Carter was born and raised in Plains, Georgia, graduated as valedictorian of Plains High School, and soon after attended Georgia Southwestern College, where she graduated in 1946. She first became attracted to her future husband, also from Plains, after seeing a picture of him in his U.S. Naval Academy uniform, and they married in 1946. Carter helped her husband win the governorship of Georgia in 1970, and decided to focus her attention in the field of mental health when she was that state's first lady. She campaigned for him during his successful bid to become president of the United States in the 1976 election, defeating incumbent Republican president Gerald Ford.

Carter was politically active during her husband's presidency, though she declared that she had no intention of being a traditional first lady. During his term of office, Carter supported her husband's public policies, as well as his social and personal life. To remain fully informed, she sat in on Cabinet meetings at the invitation of the President. Carter also represented her husband in meetings with domestic and foreign leaders, including as an envoy to Latin America in 1977. He found her to be an equal partner. She campaigned for her husband’s failed re-election bid in the 1980 election, which he lost in a landslide to Republican nominee Ronald Reagan.

After leaving the White House in 1981, Carter continued to advocate for mental health and other causes, wrote several books, and became involved in the national and international work of the Carter Center. Her husband and she also contributed to the expansion of the nonprofit housing organization Habitat for Humanity. In 1987, she founded the Institute for Caregivers, to inform and support the efforts of caregivers. She received the Presidential Medal of Freedom alongside her husband in 1999.

== Early life ==
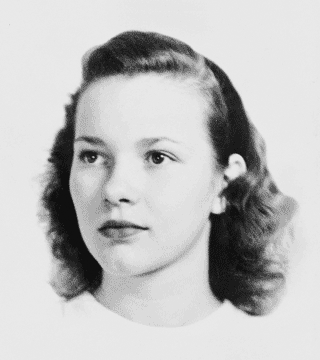
Rosalynn around age 17 in 1944

Eleanor Rosalynn Smith was born on August 18, 1927, in Plains, Georgia. She was the eldest of four children of Wilburn Edgar Smith, an auto mechanic, bus driver, and farmer, and Frances Allethea "Allie" Murray Smith, a teacher, dressmaker, and postal worker. Her brothers were William Jerrold "Jerry" Smith (1929–2003), an engineer, and Murray Lee Smith (1932–2003), a teacher and minister. Her sister, Lillian Allethea (Smith) Wall (born 1936), known as Allethea, named for her mother and for Lillian Gordy Carter (the Smith and Carter families being friends), is a real estate broker. Rosalynn was named after Rosa Wise Murray, her maternal grandmother. Smith's grand-uncle W.S. Wise was one of the American Brazilians known as Confederados who emigrated from the United States to the Brazilian Empire after the American Civil War.

Smith's family lived in poverty, although she later said that her siblings and she were unaware of it, because even though their family "didn't have much money [...] neither did anyone else, so as far as we knew, we were well off." Churches and schools were at the center of her family's community, and the people of Plains were familiar with each other. Smith played with the boys during her early childhood, since no girls on her street were her age. She drew buildings and was interested in airplanes, which led her to believe that she would someday become an architect.

Rosalynn's father died of leukemia in 1940, when she was 13. She called the loss of her father the conclusion of her childhood. Thereafter, she helped her mother raise her younger siblings, and assisted in the dressmaking business to meet the family's financial obligations. Rosalynn would credit her mother with inspiring her own independence and said that she learned from her mother that "you can do what you have to do". At Plains High School, Rosalynn worked hard to achieve her father's dream of seeing her go to college. Rosalynn graduated as valedictorian of Plains High School. Soon after, she attended Georgia Southwestern College and graduated in 1946. During her time in college, Rosalynn served as vice president of her class and was a founding member of her school's Young Democrats, Campus Marshal, and Tumbling Clubs. She graduated with a junior college diploma.

Rosalynn first dated Jimmy Carter in 1945 while he was attending the United States Naval Academy at Annapolis. Rosalynn agreed to marry Jimmy in February 1946, when she went to Annapolis with his parents. The two scheduled their marriage to take place in July and kept the arrangement secret. Rosalynn was hesitant to tell her mother she had chosen to marry instead of continuing her education. On July 7, 1946, they married in Plains. Their marriage caused Rosalynn to cancel her plans to attend Georgia State College for Women, where she had planned to study interior design. The couple had four children: John William "Jack" (b. 1947), James Earl "Chip" III (b. 1950), Donnel Jeffrey "Jeff" (b. 1952), and Amy Lynn (b. 1967).

== First Lady of Georgia (1971–1975) ==
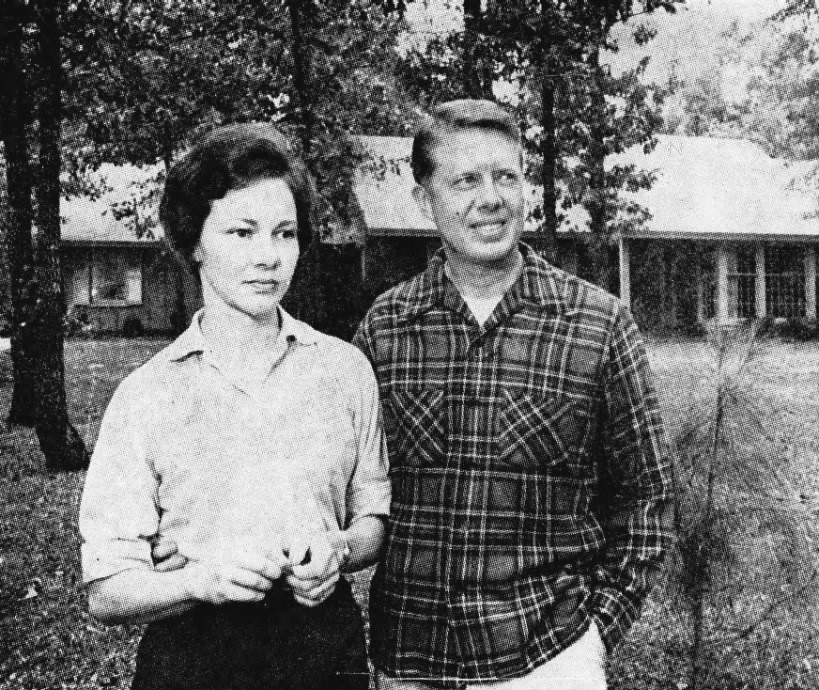
Rosalynn and her husband, Jimmy, in 1965

After helping her husband win the governorship of Georgia in 1970, Rosalynn decided to focus her attention mainly in the field of mental health when she was that state's first lady. She was appointed to the Governor's Commission to Improve Services for the Mentally and Emotionally Handicapped. Many of the commission's recommendations were approved and became law. In August 1971, Carter engaged in a statewide tour of mental-health facilities across Georgia. She described her efforts on behalf of mentally disabled children as her proudest achievement as First Lady of Georgia.

Carter also served as a volunteer at the Georgia Regional Hospital at Atlanta, and for four years was honorary chairperson for the Georgia Special Olympics.

Her work in addressing social issues made her "virtually revered in professional health-care circles." Her activities included entertaining as many as 750 people a week for dinner at the Governor's Mansion. Governor Carter once claimed that he had supported the Equal Rights Amendment, while his wife was opposed to the measure; the First Lady privately confronted him upon hearing news of the claim, and Carter corrected himself by later announcing to the press, "I thought I knew what Rosalynn thought, but I was wrong."

== Role in 1976 presidential campaign ==
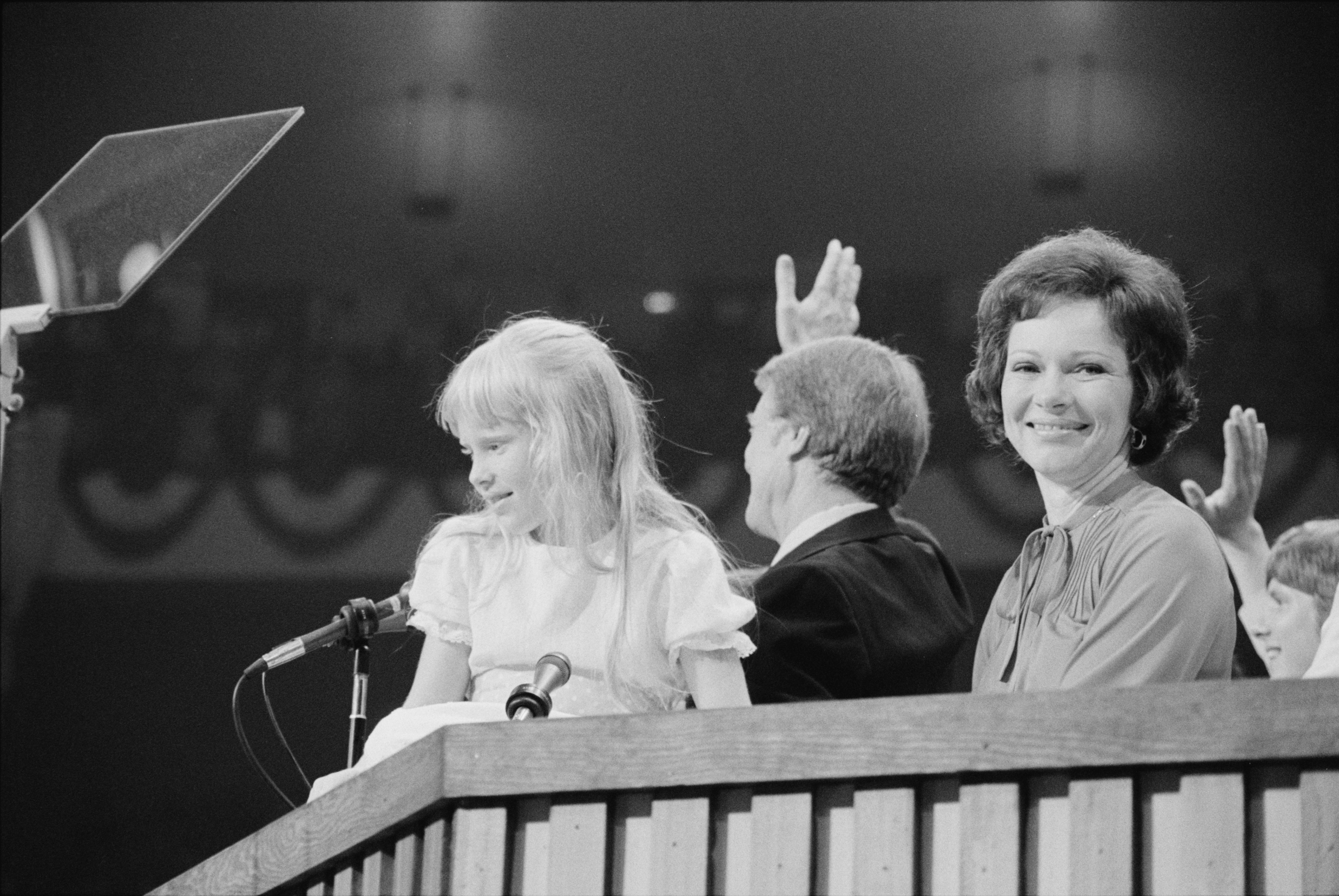
Rosalynn, Amy, and Jimmy Carter at the Democratic National Convention, New York City

When her husband's gubernatorial term ended in January 1975, Rosalynn, Jimmy, and Amy Carter returned to Plains. Jimmy had already announced his plans to run for president of the United States. Rosalynn got back on the campaign trail, this time on a national quest to gather support for her husband. She campaigned alone on his behalf in 41 states. Because of her husband's obscurity at the time, she often had to answer the question, "Jimmy who?" She promoted the establishment of additional daycare facilities and adjustments to "Social Security and so many other things to help the elderly." In summer 1975, Rosalynn left the campaign trail to spend weeks at the Carter campaign's Atlanta headquarters raising money. She would later write that asking for donations was the part of campaigning she liked the least.

During the months when she was campaigning across the country, she was elected to the board of directors of the National Association of Mental Health, honored by the National Organization for Women with an Award of Merit for her vigorous support for the Equal Rights Amendment, and received the Volunteer of the Year Award from the Southwestern Association of Volunteer Services.

Rosalynn sat in the balcony at Madison Square Garden with friends and family the night of the nomination, while her husband was with his mother and daughter. She had "butterflies in her stomach" until the Ohio delegation announced its votes were for her husband. Rosalynn wished she could have been with him at that time. The Carters met with all the potential running mates, and instantly gained affinity for Walter Mondale after meeting with him and his wife Joan. Rosalynn was unaware of her husband's choice in running mate until the 1976 Democratic National Convention, where Jimmy Carter telephoned Mondale to confirm him as his pick. At the convention, Rosalynn made several speeches to various state delegations. The Carters invited the five thousand delegates to a party where they shook the hands with all who attended, and by the event's last hour, Rosalynn was left only able to nod at guests after her mouth became dry.

After the 1976 Republican National Convention, Jimmy's lead in the polls lessened, making Rosalynn more anxious as they headed into the campaign's final months. Weeks before the election, Jimmy gave a Playboy interview where he admitted that he "looked on a lot of women with lust. I've committed adultery in my heart many times." His response would become the first question Rosalynn was asked while campaigning, and she would say she had never questioned her husband's fidelity. Jimmy Carter defeated Ford in the election. The Carters were at the campaign headquarters when the results came in. Both cried, and Rosalynn would later write that she had never been more proud. Following the election, the Carters traveled to the White House and met with President Ford and First Lady Betty Ford, the latter becoming a role model for Rosalynn.

== First Lady of the United States (1977–1981) ==
=== Major initiatives ===
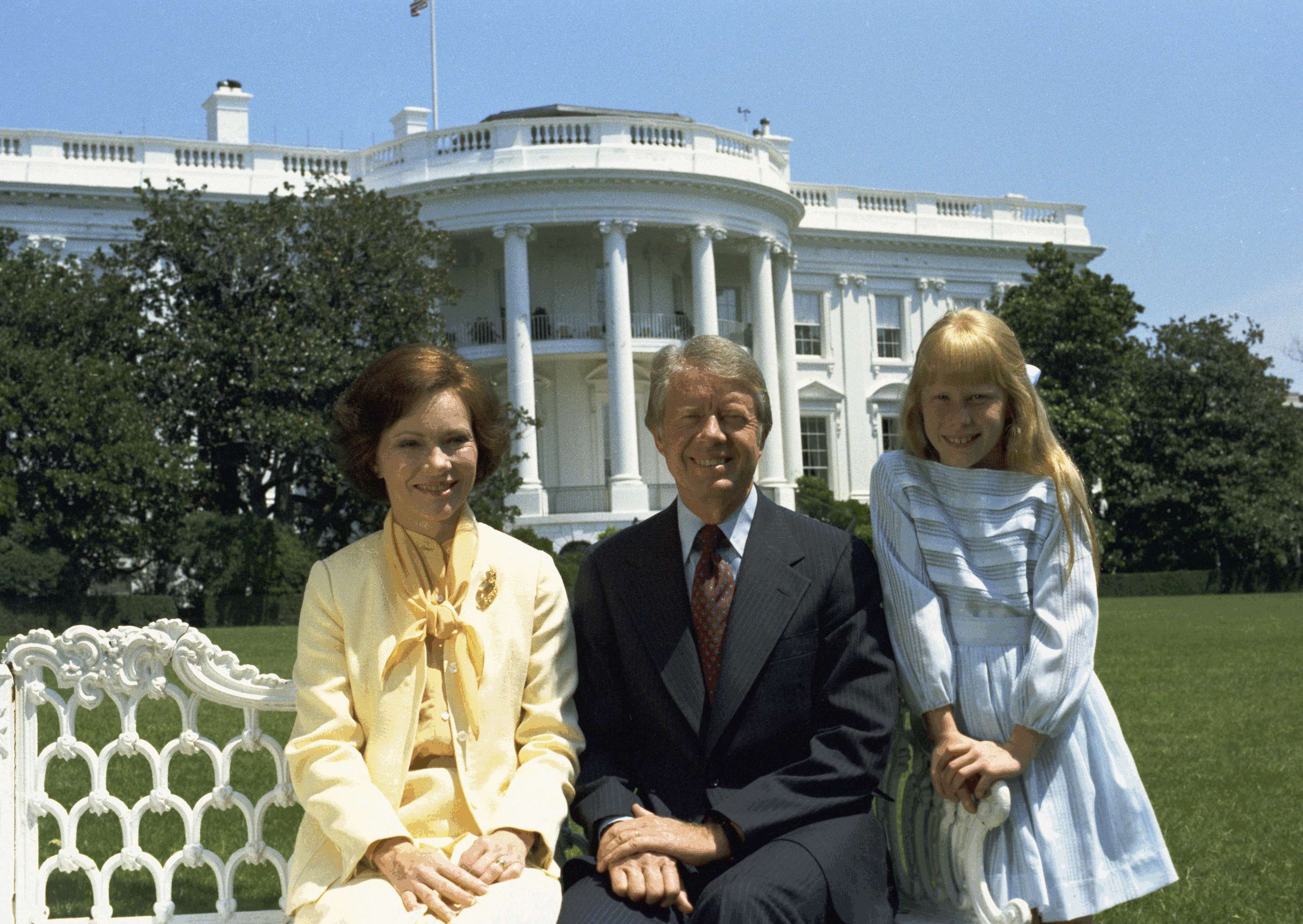
The First Family: Rosalynn, Jimmy, and Amy on the South Lawn of the White House, July 24, 1977

When her husband assumed the presidency in January 1977, Rosalynn and Jimmy Carter walked hand-in-hand down Pennsylvania Avenue during his presidential inauguration parade. The gown that she wore to the inaugural balls was the same one that she had worn six years earlier at the Atlanta balls when Jimmy became governor.

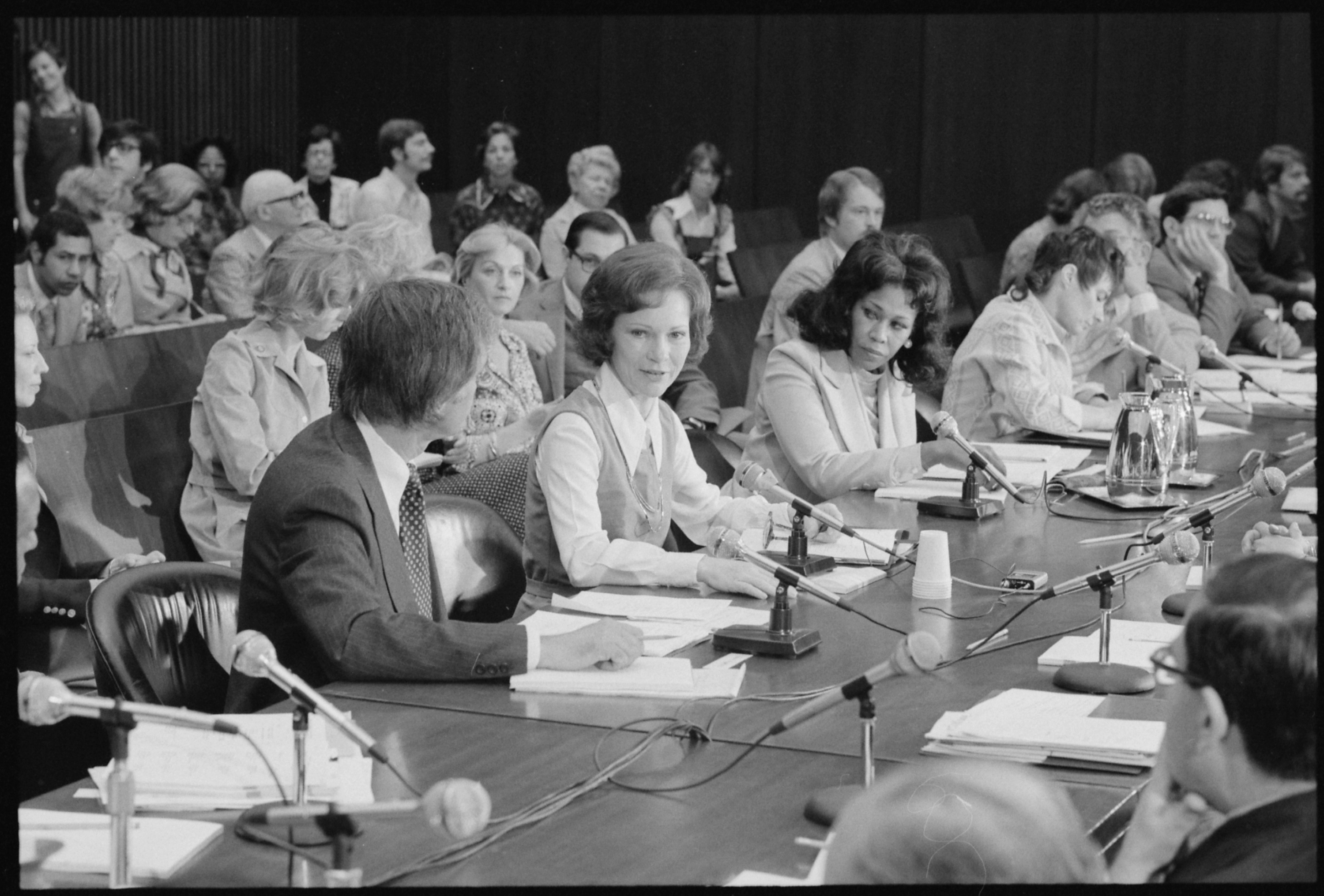
Carter chaired a meeting in Chicago, Illinois, for the President's Commission on Mental Health on April 20, 1977.

Carter declared that she had no intention of being a traditional first lady of the United States. During her husband's administration, she supported his public policies, as well as his social and personal life. To remain fully informed, she sat in on Cabinet meetings at the invitation of the President. The first meeting she attended was on February 28, 1977, where she felt comfortable since she was among other officials who were not members. The idea for her to be in attendance came at her husband's suggestion when she started to question him about a news story.

Carter took notes at the meetings, but never spoke. As she put it, "I was there to be informed so that when I traveled across the country, which I did a great deal, and was questioned by the press and other individuals about all areas of government, I'd know what was going on." When the cultural exchange program Friendship Force International launched at the White House on March 1, 1977, she became honorary chairperson, a position she held until 2002. She joined Lady Bird Johnson and Betty Ford in supporting the unsuccessful campaign for the Equal Rights Amendment (ERA) at the Houston conference celebrating the International Women's Year in 1977.

In 1977, Carter was a speaker at the 1977 National Women's Conference among other speakers including Betty Ford, Bella Abzug, Lady Bird Johnson, Barbara Jordan, Audrey Colom, Claire Randall, Gerridee Wheeler, Cecilia Burciaga, Gloria Steinem, Lenore Hershey and Jean O'Leary.

For Christmas 1977, she decorated the White House's Christmas tree with ornaments made from pine cones, peanuts, and egg shells. On July 27, 1978, Carter was the host of "First Lady's Employment Seminar". Between 200 and 300 delegates came and shared information to learn how other communities responded to the problem of unemployment. Carter remembered 1979 and 1980 as years of never-ending crises, the years having "Big ones and small ones, potential disasters and mere annoyances."

During 1978, Carter became involved with an effort to reform D.C. General Hospital after criticizing its appearance, and traveled to the hospital for reviews of changing conditions as more work was done in remodeling.

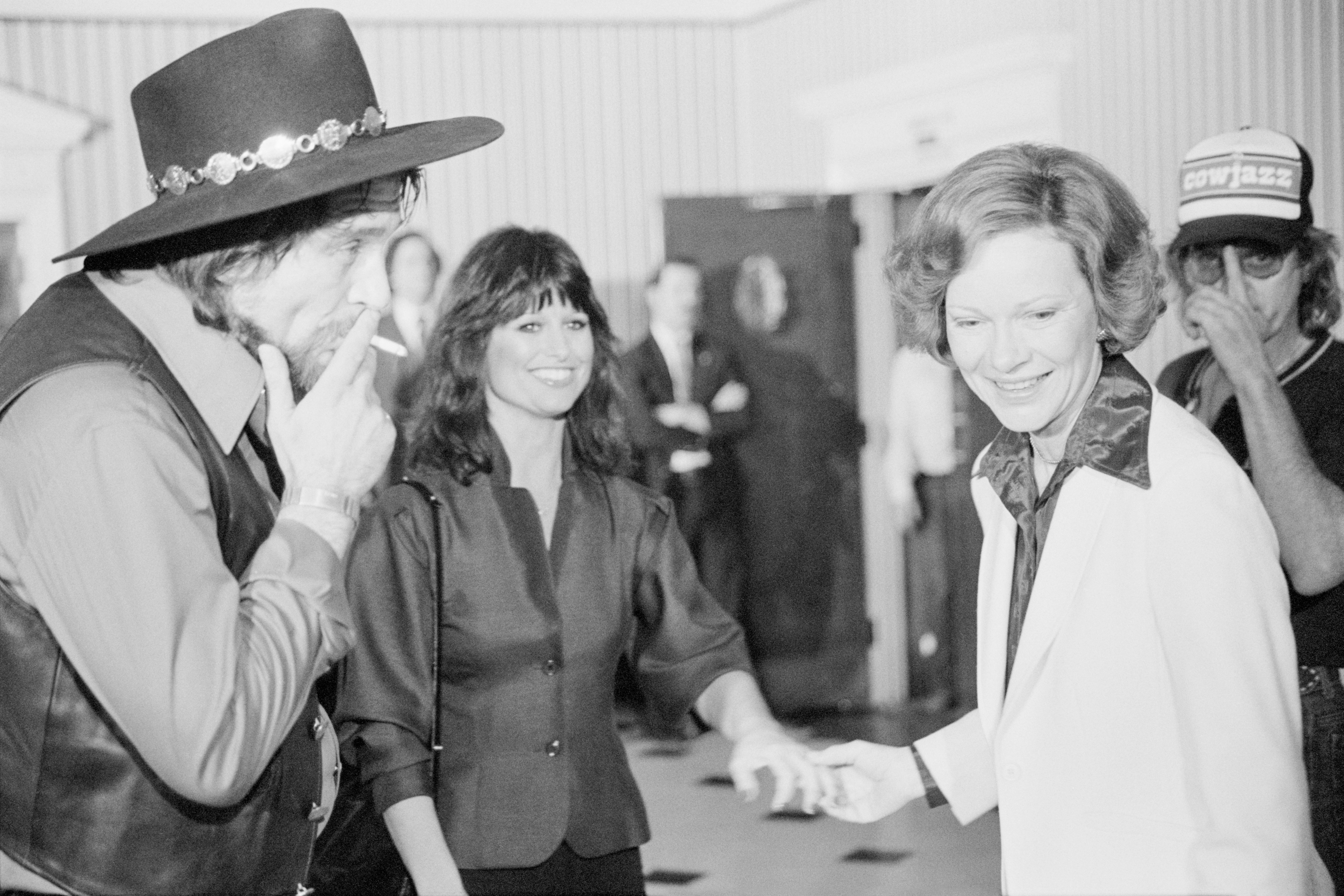
Waylon Jennings, Jessi Colter, and Carter at a reception preceding a concert to benefit the Carter-Mondale campaign on April 23, 1980

Despite finding time to entertain, the Carters never were able to match their immediate predecessors and Carter never considered it a major part of her job as first lady. Criticism came towards her role as first lady by a U.S. diplomat in Brazil, who insisted that women were meant to be kept "at home and that's all". The cultural factor had also caused many to oppose her trip. Critics called her too programmed and disciplined, while others said she lacked admirable qualities of Lady Bird Johnson and Betty Ford. Despite this, Carter was pleased by her viewed role as a demanding first lady and remembered the times of presidents' wives being "confined" to "official hostess" and other demeaning roles. In efforts to advance the appearance of the White House, she accumulated American paintings.

After the Carter administration began losing popularity, Carter advised that Gerald Rafshoon be brought on as White House Director of Communications and that key media figures be invited to the White House for "informal, off‐the‐record, deep discussions about issues." Rafshoon was selected and confirmed for the position.

Carter was a proponent of energy conservation. President Carter had rejected the declaration by Richard Nixon that the energy crisis had ended, and ordered the thermostats in the White House turned down to 65 degrees during the day and 55 at night. The move irritated Rosalynn, who found her office so cold that it was difficult to concentrate and had staff members typing with gloves. The administration faced criticism over gasoline shortages and rising prices. In a visit to New North Community School in March 1979, Carter suggested reducing trips and riding the bus, driving slower, and forming car pools. In October 1980, Carter hosted a children's party at the White House that launched the Captain America Youth Energy Conservation Program, a joint effort by the Energy Department, Campbell's, and the Marvel Entertainment Group that would feature radio spots and animated cartoon television announcements in which Captain America would tell children ways they could save energy. She reflected that the couple knew the energy campaign would be a political risk, but that the lack of an aroused public would have meant her husband "would never be able to prevail over the powerful oil companies and other lobbyists to develop an effective energy policy."

=== Mental health campaign ===
In February 1977, President Carter established the President's Commission on Mental Health, and Rosalynn was named active honorary chair. Federal nepotism laws precluded Rosalynn from being selected as chairman, and the position instead went to former Health Director of the Office of Economic Opportunity Thomas E. Bryant. She wrote in her memoir that the committee faced the challenge of being about the politically unappealing topic of mental health and having to define itself as one of President Carter's domestic priorities. In March, Carter gave her first interview since becoming first lady. She outlined her goals in focusing on mental health: "For every person who needs mental-health care to be able to receive it close to his home, and to remove the stigma from mental-health care so people will be free to talk about it and seek help. It's been taboo for so long to admit you had a mental-health problem." May saw Carter preside over the first public hearings for the President's Commission on Mental Health, where she stated her support for placing the mentally ill in community‐based programs as opposed to institutionalization. In August, she addressed the 1977 World Federation for Mental Health, where she called for the creation of "a climate in which our most vulnerable are accepted. We must start first with them. Then the rest will fall naturally into place.” She noted a study from a few years prior that showed the public had a lower opinion of the mentally ill than of ex-convicts and alcoholics.

In April 1978, the commission submitted its report to President Carter which included a $500 million program. Rosalynn was by his side, and she praised Betty Ford for admitting her addiction to medication and alcohol, the former citing her desire for more well-known Americans to speak out on their own struggles. Rosalynn wrote that the next move after completing the report was ensuring its recommendations would be implemented, and the commission received a setback when Peter Bourne resigned after writing a prescription for an assistant under a pseudonym, leaving the White House staff without a senior-level advocate that could transition the report's findings into policy.

In February 1979, Carter testified before a Senate committee on behalf of the mental health bill, making her the second first lady to appear before the Congress (the first being Eleanor Roosevelt). She notably disagreed with Ted Kennedy's claim that funding for mental health had increased in recent years. In May, Carter delivered an address before the Medical Society of the World Health Organization, becoming the first sitting First Lady to address the group. That month, the Carters made an irregular joint appearance in the press room as the president announced the Mental Health System Bill, legislation to revamp mental health care that would be introduced by Senator Kennedy and Congressman Henry A. Waxman in the Congress. President Carter signed the Mental Health Systems Act into law in October 1980, with Rosalynn in attendance. Kennedy praised the bill as a "monument" to the commitment and concern of the First Lady, and Rosalynn herself said she had "looked forward to this day for a long time." Of her priorities, mental health was the highest. Working to change the nature of government assistance to the mentally ill, Carter wanted to allow people to be comfortable admitting their disabilities without fear of being called crazy.

=== Influence ===
After Carter had been first lady for two years, Time called her the "second-most powerful person in the United States." Many times, Carter's husband called her an equal partner. He also said she was a "perfect extension of myself." During a 1977 interview, Carter admitted that she quarreled with him over his policies, but his own decision was what he acted on, and she denied influencing his major decisions. In an interview the following year, Carter stated that she did not publicly disagree with her husband's policies out of a belief that she "would lose all my effectiveness with him", as well as her opinion that the gesture would not assist in changing his perspective to her own. She said that a first lady could influence officials or the public by discussing an issue or giving attention to it.

Biographer MaryAnne Borrelli wrote that Carter considered her attempts to portray herself as a traditional wife and influencing factor in her husband's administration would be "viewed by some as dependent upon her husband, by others as lacking accountability, and by still others as doing too little—or too much". Years after leaving the White House, Carter would remain bothered by claims that she exerted too much influence on her husband, insisting they had an equal partnership. Jimmy Carter would later write that the two engaged in discussions on a variety of issues, and she was aware of everything within the administration apart from "a few highly secret and sensitive security matters".

=== Travels ===
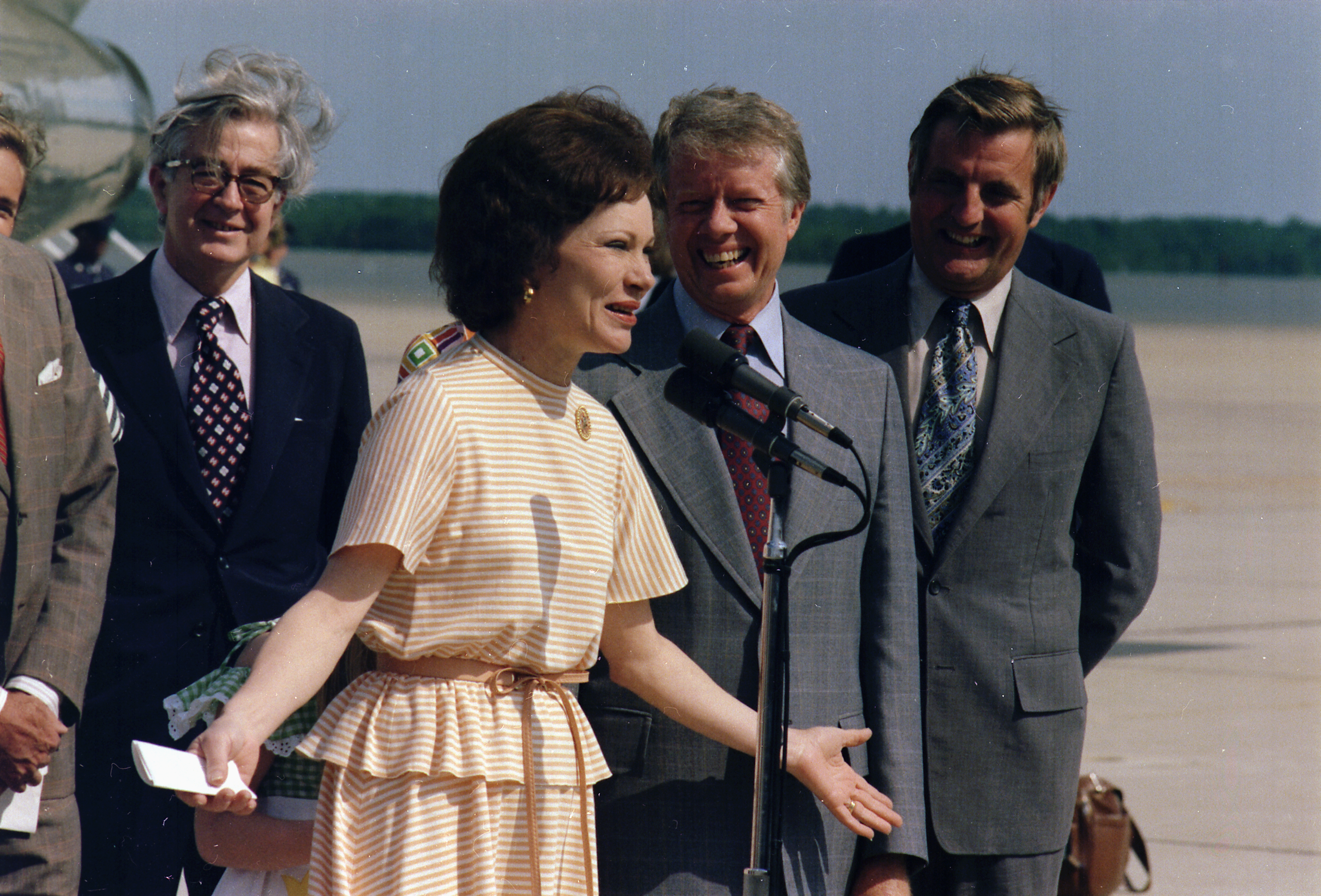
Rosalynn and Jimmy Carter with Vice President Walter Mondale at a ceremony welcoming Mrs. Carter back from a trip to Latin America, June 12, 1977

Carter represented her husband in meetings with domestic and foreign leaders, most notably as an envoy to Latin America in 1977. She purposely scheduled her meetings so as not to have any with the heads of state. President Carter said that while his wife had initially been met with hesitance as an American representative, "at the conclusion of those meetings, they now rely on her substantially to be sure that I understand the sensitivities of the people". Following the Latin America meetings, David Vidal observed, "Mrs. Carter has achieved a personal and diplomatic success that goes far beyond the modest expectations of both her foreign policy tutors at the State Department and her hosts."

Carter was met by Foreign Minister António Francisco Azeredo da Silveira and a series of dignitaries when she arrived at the airport in Brasília. Her arrival statement noted that she had previously visited Brazil with her husband five years earlier. The visit came as relations between the US and Brazil had strained from the Carter administration placing emphasis on human rights and publicly criticizing the Brazilian government for its practices. During a June 7 news conference, Carter stated that her meetings with Brazilian leaders included discussions on human rights and her wishes for Brazil to include itself among other countries seeking a reduction in nuclear weapons via an international study. On December 30, 1977, Rosalynn Carter and National Security Advisor Zbigniew Brzezinski met with Stefan Wyszyński at the Cardinal's Warsaw residence. President Carter said the meeting was intended to display American "appreciation for the degree of freedom of worship in the country".

In January 1978, Carter toured the Centre Pompidou in Paris and viewed paintings by Henri Matisse and Andy Warhol. Carter led the American delegation to the May 1978 inauguration of Rodrigo Carazo Odio as president of Costa Rica. In August 1978, she led the American delegation to the funeral of Pope Paul VI in Rome.

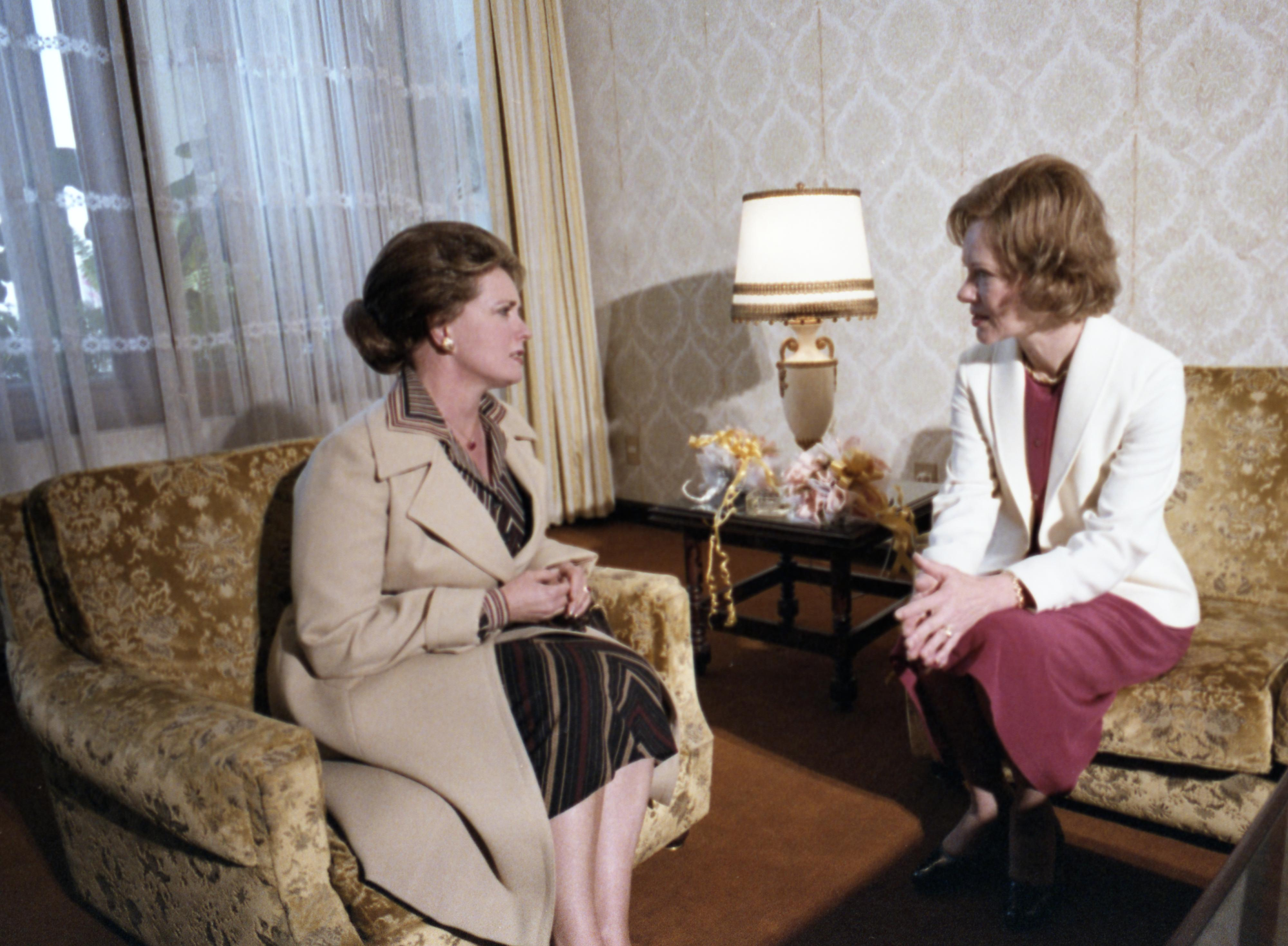
Carter received by Jehan Sadat, First Lady of Egypt, in Cairo, March 8, 1979

She also led a delegation to Thailand in 1979 to address the problems of Cambodian and Laotian refugees. She examined camps where Cambodian refugees had fled to avoid the combat between the Vietnamese troops and the government of Pol Pot. Helping the refugees, particularly the children, became a special cause for her. She returned to the United States and played a prominent role in expediting an appeal for large assistance after she witnessed their suffering during her visit. By this time, however, her husband had met with families of the hostages in Iran. The families were more concerned about what they needed to do to get their loved ones out than they were about whether or not they would ever get out. Carter stated that she had wanted to return to the U.S. as quickly as possible to mobilize assistance to assuage the refugees' plight.

Carter attended the inauguration of Fernando Belaúnde as President of Peru in July 1980, her appearance intended to be a show of American support for Peru's return to democracy.

=== Life in the White House ===
Carter was the first of all the first ladies to keep her own office in the East Wing. She also oversaw her family at the White House. Her daughter, Amy, attracted much public attention. The two youngest sons, Chip and Jeff, and their families also lived in the White House. Other members of the family, including son Jack and his wife and children, were frequent visitors. Carter's Secret Service codename was "Dancer". In 1977, Carter reported that her family was divided in their reaction to public perception of them, saying her sons were worried about how they would be perceived living there, while she personally thought nothing of it as the public was not financing their residence and she favored the family being together. The Truman Balcony became Carter's favorite place in the White House for its view of Washington. The First Couple would sit there and talk about the events of a day on many late afternoons, and during the summer, would eat lunch there.

On August 16, 1979, Carter released a statement announcing Edith J. Dobelle had accepted "the newly created position of staff director for the East Wing".

After leaving the White House, Carter reflected of Washington, "I love this city. I loved living here and being so close to the seat of power, being a part of the political system. When you watched television you knew the people involved, you were familiar with both sides of the issues."

=== Equal Rights Amendment ===
During the 1976 campaign, Carter spoke to feminists about her equal partnership with her husband. In January 1977, prior to his inauguration, Carter substituted for him in speaking with Senator Birch Bayh over the phone, as the latter wanted President-elect Carter to lobby for support of the Equal Rights Amendment (ERA) being ratified in Indiana. She persuaded Wayne Townsend to switch his vote and the ERA was approved in an Indiana Senate vote of 26 to 24. The ERA was defeated in North Carolina in February 1977, all but eliminating the chances of women winning constitutional protection against discrimination that year. The White House confirmed the loss caused the Carters to reassess their campaign strategy in support of the ERA. Rosalynn attended the March fundraising reception for the National Women's political caucus, where her husband declared the US's delays in passing the ERA were hurting the nation's credibility in setting international human rights standards. In November, Carter endorsed the Justice Department's proposal to extend the time limit for the Equal Rights Amendment's passage by three years.

In February 1978, Carter traveled to Tampa, Florida to a fundraising ball for the ERA. Opponents of the measure charged the First Lady with using taxpayer funds for political purposes, and she responded to the claim by stating the Democratic National Committee had paid for that trip and all of her political activities. In October, President Carter signed H.J. Res. 638, a resolution extending the time for ratification of the equal rights amendment by three years. On the work that remained, the president said, "I think Sarah Weddington here on my staff will be a major asset, and of course, my wife".

In December 1979, the executive board of the National Organization for Women voted to oppose President Carter's re-election on the basis of both the Equal Rights Amendment not being passed and their belief that he was not trying hard enough to win its passage. Rosalynn responded by stating she believed it had not been passed "because people don't understand it and because there has been so much distortion about what it will do" and defended her husband as having appointed women to more "top jobs" in the federal government than any president before him. No additional states adopted the ERA before its deadline in 1982, and Carter would later write that the failure to get the ERA passed was her biggest disappointment.

In reference to Carter's role in supporting the ERA, Texas Christian University Associate Professor of Religion Elizabeth Flowers said, "[Rosalynn Carter] wanted to temper down some of the more radical elements of feminism, as she saw it, and challenge what she felt were caricatures of the movement. She wanted to be sure that the struggle for ERA really appealed to mainstream America."

=== Public image ===
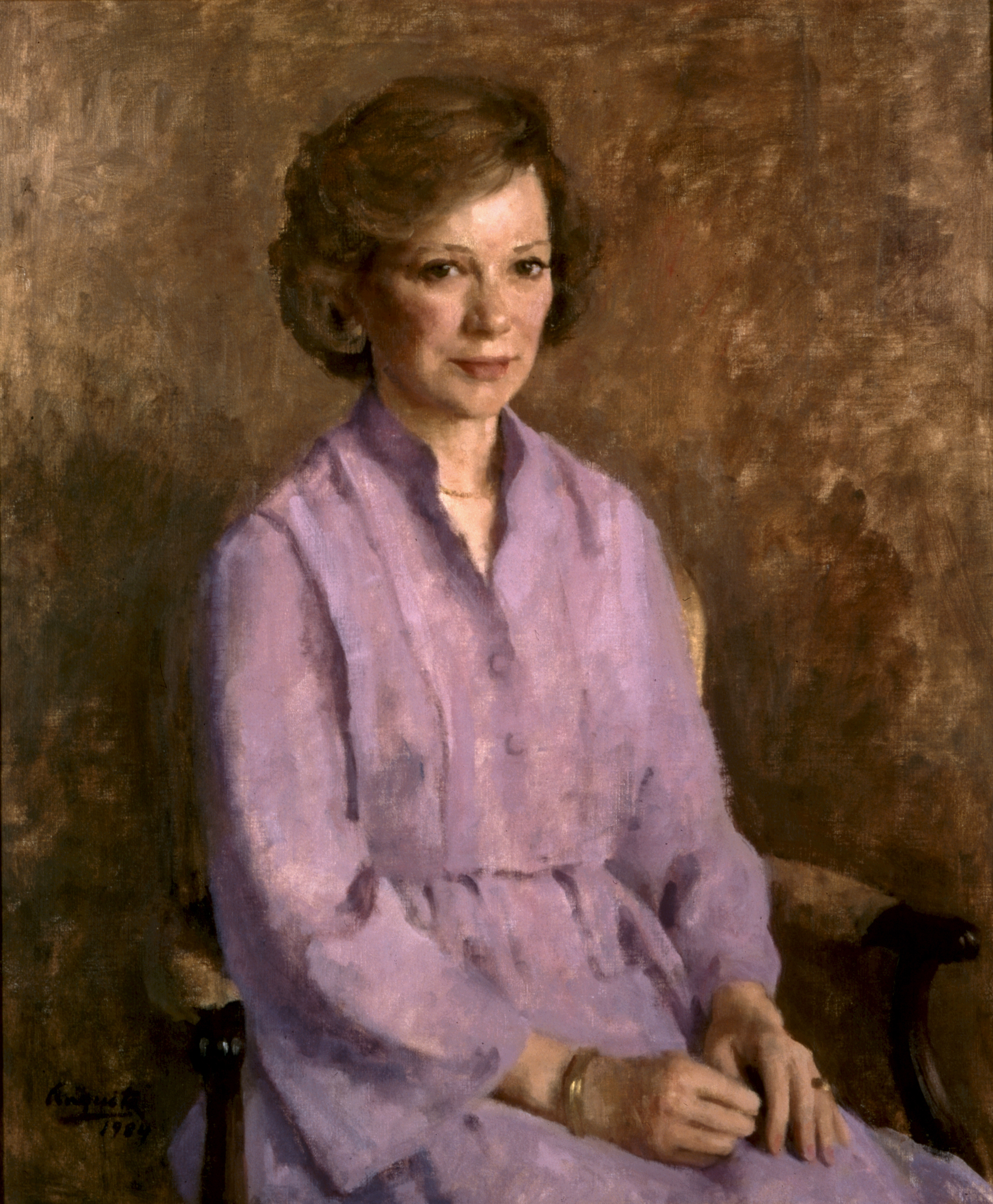
Carter's official White House portrait by George Augusta

During the 1976 election cycle, journalists dubbed Carter the "steel magnolia" for having a fragile and feminine appearance that concealed a "tough as nails" interior. Carter was known for a lack of attention paid to fashion, and her choice to wear the gown she wore at her husband's swearing-in as governor to his presidential inauguration reinforced this view of her. She brought her hair stylist to the White House, and was often seen with a briefcase and wore traditional shirtwaists in colors like lilac and fuchsia which Vanessa Friedman defines as being more "associated with well-behaved homemakers as opposed to policymakers." Her modest attire was seen as an extension of the administration's conservatism and her attire, following the 1980 election, was regulated to a cautionary tale as conventional wisdom "had it that the American people simply didn’t want their first hostess to look quite so much like them after all — at least not once she (or her husband) had been elected." Nancy Gibbs of Time describes Carter as "earnest, high protein", noting that the Carters "sold off the presidential yacht, turned down the thermostat, offered inaugural ball tickets for $25." In her memoir, Carter wrote of having to come to terms with her public image: "I learned that labels are easy to come by and hard to overcome. I had been called a 'steel magnolia' in the campaign, to which I didn't object, and it was just as well. Once something is printed, it repeats and repeats."

Carter's public interest in national policy prompted Kandy Stroud of The New York Times to speculate she might become the most activist first lady since Eleanor Roosevelt. Melanne Verveer said she would put Carter "in the category of activist first lady" and noted that while the position had no definition and was only acquired through marriage, Carter was able to build off her activism as Georgia's First Lady. The American Psychiatric Association credits Carter with being among the first public figures not within the psychiatry community to normalize mental health struggles and to extend empathy toward those having serious mental issues. Joshua P. Cohen of Forbes opined that Carter left "behind an immensely valuable legacy" through raising awareness of issues pertaining to mental health and offering solutions, and though stressing the work that remained, hailed Carter for having "paved the way to find solutions to our mental health crisis. She was a driving force for change throughout her public service career." John Casey of The Advocate writes that her activism paved the way for public figures to become open about their mental experiences, and that he and others "owe a great deal to Mrs. Carter for the privilege of sharing our stories about battling mental health problems, which provide solace and help for those who suffer."

Amid the sinking approval ratings of her husband, Carter maintained high favorable viewpoints in the eyes of the public, and was tied with Mother Teresa for most-admired woman in the world. In April 1979, during her speech as guest speaker at the 1979 Matrix Awards Luncheon of New York Women in Communications Inc., Carter said the issues she was championing were being met with opposition due to their lack of sexiness in being topics a first lady discusses. By August 1979, while her husband’s approval rating was at 32%, Rosalynn Carter’s approval rating stood at 59% to a disapproval rating of 19%. By the time Carter reached the final three months of her tenure as first lady, she had a 46% approval rating, a 9% disapproval rating, and 45% not giving an opinion about her. In November 1980, a survey of United Press International's broadcast subscribers named Ronald Reagan as the most important male newsmaker and Carter as the most important woman newsmaker. She was closely followed by Prime Minister of the United Kingdom Margaret Thatcher, who trailed by ten votes.

Carter's popularity fluctuated heavily during her retirement. In 1981, Newsweek ran a poll on the six First Ladies since 1960, and Carter was voted to have made the second-best impression, behind only Jacqueline Kennedy. A 2010 national poll by Angus Reid Public Opinion asked Americans to name their favorite First Lady since 1974, and Carter, Betty Ford, and Barbara Bush were the only ones to come under 10 percent. 2018 YouGov Ratings data noted a trend of presidents from the Democratic Party being more popular than their wives, Rosalynn's approval rating being 39% to Jimmy Carter's 51%. In 2021, Zogby Analytics conducted a poll in which a sample of the American public was asked to assess the greatness of twelve First Ladies from Jacqueline Kennedy onwards. The American public ranked Carter only the ninth-greatest of the twelve first ladies assessed. A 2023 YouGov poll found Carter and Michelle Obama as the First Ladies most likely to be rated as "outstanding or above average".

=== 1980 presidential campaign ===
In November 1979, a group of Iranian students took over the US Embassy in Tehran. The students belonged to the Muslim Student Followers of the Imam's Line and supported the Iranian revolution. They held fifty-two American diplomats and citizens hostage. Carter addressed the Florida Democratic Convention later that month in St. Petersburg, Florida, calling the crisis "an outrage totally outside the bounds of international law." She furthered that the administration's goal was getting each hostage released safely and referred to the situation as "the most trying period" of her husband's presidency. President Carter announced his re-election campaign in December 1979, and was challenged by Ted Kennedy in the Democratic presidential primaries. He would later write that the ongoing Iran hostage crisis impacted his choice to rely on his wife among others in his administration to advocate for his policies on the campaign trail. Vice President Mondale would come to view himself and Rosalynn as President Carter's proxies through much of the spring portion of the election cycle. She would reflect that the Iowa victory of the Carter re-election campaign, which saw President Carter defeat Kennedy 59.2% to 31.2%, made it easier for her to be unbothered by Kennedy's attacks. Although President Carter was able to secure the nomination, Rosalynn would come to believe that Kennedy had damaged the Democratic Party through his campaign and inadequately assisted in the general election: "He was a poor loser. I thought that once he saw that he could not win, he would try to help the Democratic Party, because I thought it was so important to keep Ronald Reagan out of the White House and I thought he should have helped. Instead, he tore the Democratic Party to pieces."

President Carter faced Reagan in the general election. Rosalynn was confident her husband would get re-elected. On her birthday, she saw polls that showed they were gaining on Reagan, whose previous lead of 25% had decreased to 7%. Jerry Falwell, who had opposed Carter in 1976, had become a national force with his daily television programs and supporters of him and his organization, the Moral Majority, made appearances protesting Rosalynn's campaign stops in the South and West. Carter visited Centenary College of Louisiana in September, and was met by anti-abortion protestors carrying signs and infants. While she did not directly speak to the protestors, she told a news conference that she and the president had always been against abortion and they had authored "the most conservative law (on abortion) that the Supreme Court would allow" during his governorship. In the November 4 election, Carter lost to Reagan in a landslide. She later cited Christian conservatives, the Iran hostage crisis, inflation, and the desire to wage a protest vote against the current administration with having contributed to Carter's defeat. Her husband's loss came shortly after the passing of the Mental Health System Act, which sought to do much of what she had worked for during her tenure as first lady. However, after Ronald Reagan was elected, she reflected, "funding of our legislation was killed, by the philosophy of a new President. It was a bitter loss."

In the days following the election, Carter experienced depression, which led her husband to express the benefits of his impending post-presidency. She telephoned supporters of the re-election campaign to thank them for their involvement, and met with Reagan's wife, Nancy, during the transitional period and gave her a tour of the White House. Carter and Nancy Reagan developed a friendship as a result of their shared support for the ERA. She was also satisfied that the Iran hostages were released on the day of Reagan's inauguration.

== Later life (1981–2023) ==
=== Activism ===
==== The Carter Center ====
After the Carters left the White House in 1981, they continued to lead a very active life. In 1982, she co-founded the Carter Center, a private, nonprofit institution based in Atlanta, Georgia. The Carters returned to the home they had built in 1961 in Plains, Georgia. She was a member of the center's board of trustees and participated in many of the center's programs, but gave special attention to the mental health program. Carter and her husband fell into serious debt immediately after leaving the White House, but were able to pay off their debts by engaging in writing projects and eventually were able to open the Carter Center from their revenue. She, like Betty Ford before her, would say the American people made a mistake in not re-electing her husband and was bitter over the election. At this time she expressed resentment of Ronald Reagan, and even told interviewer Mike Wallace that he was ruining the country. Rumors at this time spread that she was running for Governor of Georgia, which she denied and outright stated that she had no political ambition. Nearly two decades later when Hillary Clinton was pondering whether or not to run for Senator in New York, Carter was asked why she had not run for the Georgia Senate. She responded "What would I have done in Washington, with Jimmy in Georgia?"

Carter and her husband's first major project with the Carter Center was to help broker a peace deal between Israel and its neighbors. They visited the Middle East in March 1983 and worked with Kenneth W. Stein and other associates of the Carter administration. They invited top leaders from a wide range of cities and countries to participate, including the Palestinians, Jordan, Syria, and Egypt.

In the early summer of 1986, the Carters aided the poor by helping to build homes on the north and west sides of Chicago. They were accompanied by members of Habitat for Humanity as they wielded hammers and saws while working for a week to construct homes in a vacant lot. In 1991, the Carters removed themselves and the Carter Center from direct involvement in the Middle East at the time that President George H. W. Bush's administration, especially Secretary of State James Baker, became more active in that region. However, they did monitor the Oslo peace agreement of 1993, which sprang from the President and Secretary of State's bringing Palestinians and other parties involved in the matter to a conference in Madrid.

==== Mental health advocacy ====
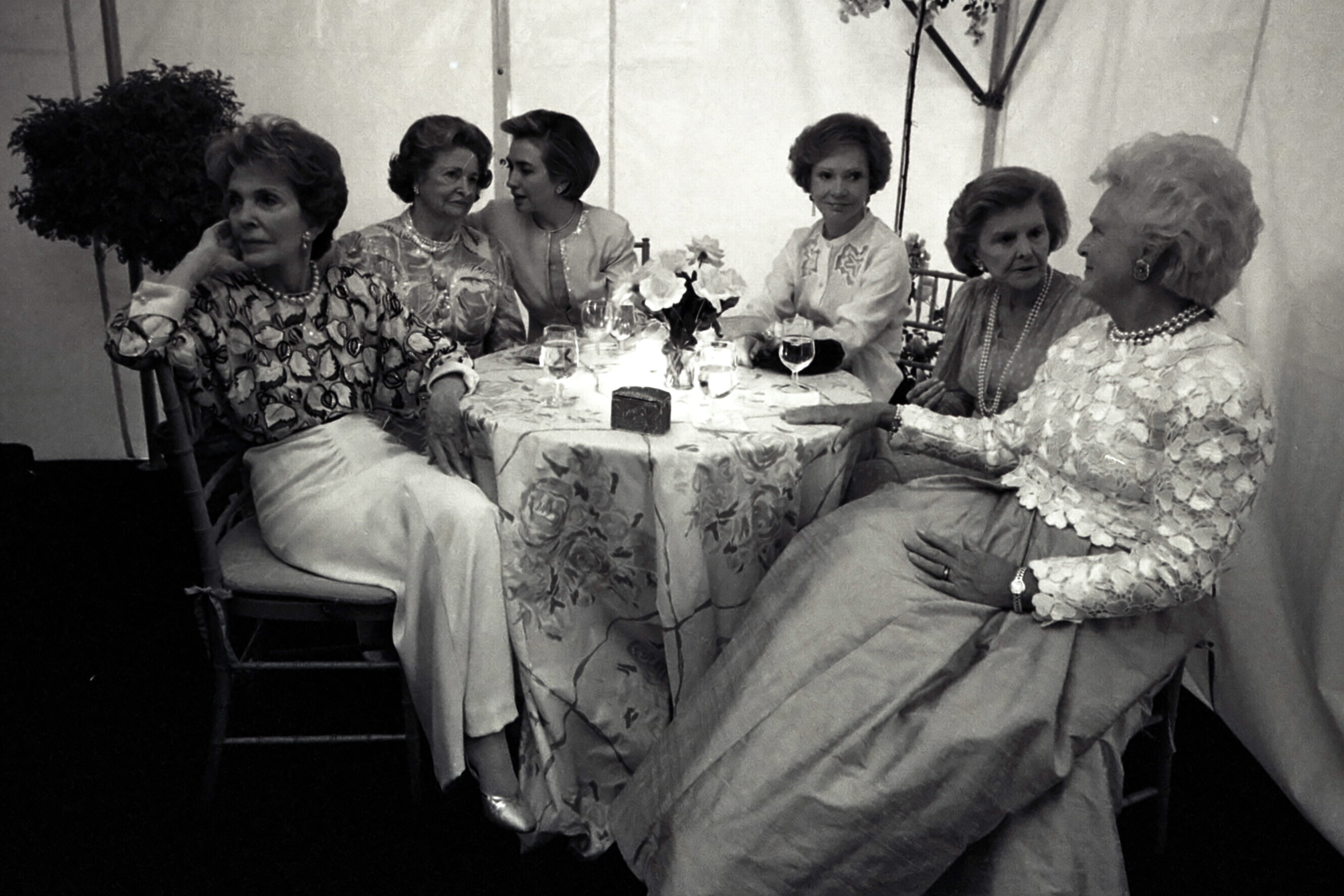
Carter joins First Ladies (left to right) Nancy Reagan, Lady Bird Johnson, Hillary Clinton, Carter, Betty Ford, and Barbara Bush at the National Garden Gala: A Tribute to America's First Ladies in May 1994

Carter created and served as the chair of The Carter Center Mental Health Task Force, an advisory board of experts, consumers, and advocates promoting positive change in the mental health field. She hosted the annual Rosalynn Carter Symposium on Mental Health Policy, bringing together nationwide leaders in the mental health field.

In April 1984, she became an Honorary Fellow of the American Psychiatric Association and served as a board member emeritus of the National Mental Health Association. In 1985, she started the Rosalynn Carter Symposium on Mental Health Policy. The launch and its proceeds allowed representatives of mental health organizations to come together and collaborate on prominent issues. The success of the symposium led to the creation of the Mental Health Program in 1991. Carter established the Mental Health Task Force that same year to guide the Symposia as well as other Mental Health programs. She became chair of the International Women Leaders for Mental Health in 1992, and three years later she was honored with the naming of the Rosalynn Carter Mental Georgia Health Forum after her.

The Rosalynn Carter Fellowships for Mental Health Journalism provide stipends to journalists to report on topics related to mental health or mental illnesses. The one-year fellowship seeks to promote public awareness of mental health issues, as well as to erase the stigma associated with them. In September 2004, Carter met with the recipients of the eighth annual Rosalynn Carter Fellowships for Mental Health Journalism at the Carter Center.

In 2007, Carter joined with David Wellstone, son of one-time U.S. Senator Paul Wellstone, in pushing Congress to pass legislation regarding mental health insurance. She and Wellstone worked to pass the Paul Wellstone and Pete Domenici Mental Health Parity and Addiction Equity Act of 2008 which requires equal coverage of mental and physical illnesses when policies include both types of coverage. Furthermore, both testified before a House subcommittee regarding the bill in July 2007.

Legislation requiring parity in health insurance coverage for treatment of mental illnesses was ultimately passed and signed into law in October 2008.

=== Rosalynn Carter Institute for Caregivers ===
Carter was president of the board of directors for the Rosalynn Carter Institute for Caregiving (RCI) at Georgia Southwestern State University, her alma mater in Americus, Georgia. The RCI, which was established in 1987, aims to address issues related to caregiving in both the United States and internationally. The institute focuses its work on both family and professional caregivers for individuals living with chronic illness and disabilities, limitations related to aging, and other health concerns people encounter in their lifespan. It plays a major role in moving science into practice for caregivers by supporting the implementation of evidence-based programs and interventions for caregivers in community settings. The inaugural Rosalynn Carter Institute Gala Celebration of Caregivers took place in June 2004 in Atlanta Symphony Hall and featured Carter presenting bronze medallions to award winners. In June 2025, nineteen months after Carter's death, RCI announced it was merging with the Carter Center and the merger would build "on Mrs. Carter’s vision and leadership and on the tireless work of generations of staff and partners to serve the millions of family caregivers in need. Our united efforts will improve outcomes by dramatically increasing our impact on seeing, hearing, and supporting family caregivers."

=== Advocacy for women and children ===
In January 1982, Carter relayed a telegram to the Georgia House in which former Presidents Ford and Carter expressed their support for the state to adopt the Equal Rights Amendment. The proposal was rejected in a vote of 116 to 57.

In 1988, she convened with three other former first ladies—Betty Ford, Lady Bird Johnson, and Pat Nixon—at the "Women and the Constitution" conference in The Carter Center to assess that document's impact on women. The conference featured over 150 speakers and 1,500 attendees from all 50 states and 10 foreign countries. The conference was meant to promote awareness of sexual inequality in other countries, and to fight against it in the United States.

Carter served on the Policy Advisory Board of The Atlanta Project (TAP) of The Carter Center, addressing social ills associated with poverty and quality of life citywide.

In 1991, Carter launched Every Child By Two, a nationwide campaign that sought to increase early childhood immunizations along with Betty Bumpers, wife of former U.S. Senator Dale Bumpers of Arkansas. Carter served as president of the organization and Bumpers as vice president. The campaign's launch was in response to the deaths of nearly 150 people after a resurgence of measles.

In August 2004, as Every Child by Two President, Carter released a report showing 20 percent of U.S. preschoolers do not get routine vaccinations on time. The report called for using immunization registries to ensure vaccines are kept up-to-date, more access for the underinsured to vaccinations and obligating insurers to cover all childhood vaccines, informing the public of benefits and safety of vaccines, and increasing funding for vaccines.

Carter also served on the board of advisors for Habitat for Humanity and as an honorary chair of Project Interconnections, both of which aim to provide housing for those in need. Additionally, she was a deacon at her and her husband's Plains Baptist church.

=== General activities ===
==== 1980s ====
After the October 1981 assassination of Anwar Sadat, the Carters contacted his wife Jehan Sadat and traveled with former presidents Nixon and Ford to represent the United States at his funeral. The Carters visited Jehan, who Rosalynn pledged to stay with during the funeral. Later that month, the Carters attended the National Mental Health Association's gala dinner dance, their first visit to Washington since leaving the White House. Carter presented former Governor of New York W. Averell Harriman with an award during the event. In December, she released a statement on the death of her personal secretary Rita Regina Merthan.

In May 1982, the Carters traveled to Norway, Sweden, Denmark, Finland and France. In October, Carter attended the funeral of Bess Truman in Independence, Missouri.

In March 1983, the Carters traveled throughout the Middle East. In August, Carter was elected to the board of directors of Gannett Co. Inc., notable as her first business association since leaving the White House. Carter pledged "to make a significant contribution" to Gannett. In late 1983, Carter visited her ailing mother-in-law Lillian Carter at Americus-Sumter County Hospital, and was by her bedside when she died. Days later, she attended the funeral, where a eulogist hailed Lillian's many good works.

Leading up to the 1984 election, former President Carter was mentioned as a possible candidate (a prospective run supported by his wife), but announced he would not be a candidate. Mondale, Carter's former Vice President, ran for the nomination. In October 1983, while attending a conference of Friendship Force, Carter expressed that there was a gender gap in the Reagan administration that would take "sincerity on the part of the president to be able to overcome that". She mentioned being a member of the Mondale election committee and said, 'I am going to do everything I can that is possible to get a Democratic White House." In June 1984, Carter told U.S. News & World Report that she understood why some Democrats would view her husband as a liability when campaigning, but that it nonetheless upset her because he was "an asset to the party". Mondale became the Democratic nominee the following month, and selected Geraldine Ferraro as his running mate. In October, Carter said "the respect for our country has plummeted under the leadership of this president, who thinks all world problems can be solved with military force and has led us into one of the worst arms races ever -- an arms race that can destroy our entire world." She praised the debating skills of Ferraro and predicted the Mondale-Ferraro ticket would win. Reagan defeated Mondale in the election.

Carter, Betty Ford, Lynda Bird Johnson Robb, Luci Baines Johnson, and Susan Ford Vance participated in an April 1984 symposium on modern first ladies at the Gerald Ford Museum. Carter and Ford both admitted to having disagreements with their husbands on policy issues, and Carter praised the White House with having given her "so many wonderful opportunities. If you wanted to do something, the resources were there."

In June 1985, the former first couple and their daughter Amy met Cambodian refugees at a field hospital and evacuation site in Thailand. Rosalynn opened the second Asia-Pacific conference of Friendship Force while the former president delivered a keynote address. In October, the Carters traveled to Nepal for a thirteen-day vacation in the Himalayan kingdom.

In October 1986, the Carters gave President Reagan and his wife Nancy a tour of the Jimmy Carter Library and Museum. The Carters traveled to Bangladesh the following month for a meeting between former President Carter and President Hussain Muhammad Ershad. The couple were greeted by Prime Minister Mizanur Rahman Chowdhury and crowds of schoolchildren upon their arrival.

In June 1987, the Carters traveled to Moscow for a meeting between the former president and Premier of the Soviet Union Mikhail Gorbachev. In a 1987 interview, Carter admitted to having considered running for Governor of Georgia: "The timing just wasn't right. I really don't think I would run for office unless I found I was unable to do something about an issue I cared about." Carter also criticized the media as having been too lenient on President Reagan, saying the public "could have really benefited from more intense scrutiny by the media, given the way some things have turned out."

On January 19, 1988, Carter was given the honor of christening the cruise ship Sovereign of the Seas in a gala ceremony in Miami. It was the largest cruise ship in the world at the time. A special oversized 26 1/4 liter bottle of Taittinger's champagne was used. In March 1988, Carter attended a hearing on mental health by the House Select Committee on Aging. She lamented that ten years after a presidential commission found that 10 percent of Americans needed some form of mental health care, "most who were underserved at that time are still underserved in 1988". Later that month, the Carters traveled to Nigeria for discussions with officials on disease control and rural development projects.

==== 1990s ====
In April 1991, the Carters traveled to Beijing. The couple met with senior Chinese government officials and visited educational and medical facilities aided by in a push for improvements in China's human rights policy. Carter attended the November 4, 1991, dedication of the Ronald Reagan Presidential Library and Museum.

Governor of Arkansas Bill Clinton ran for the Democratic nomination in the 1992 presidential election, and his wife Hillary received attention for her interest in policy. Carter spoke with her about receiving similar criticism for having sat in Cabinet meetings. The Carters met with Senator Paul Tsongas and his wife Niki when the presidential hopeful visited them in Plains ahead of the Georgia primary. The Carters attended the first inauguration of Bill Clinton, where the Clintons thanked various celebrities for coming and never mentioned the former first couple. Rosalynn called the reception "rude beyond belief" and remarked, "Not even [former President] Reagan would have done a thing like that." On September 13, 1993, the Carters returned to the White House for a ceremony that featured the signing by Israel and the PLO of an agreement on Palestinian self-government. Former president George H. W. Bush joined the Carters in staying overnight at the invitation of President Bill Clinton so that they could attend a ceremony promoting the North American Free Trade Agreement the next day. This marked "the first time ever that two former presidents have stayed as guests of the President overnight", according to a presidential aide. Over the course of Bill Clinton's first term, Hillary telephoned Rosalynn a single time and never paid her a courtesy call in spite of repeated appearances in Atlanta. After the DNC sent the Carters fundraising notecards that featured pictures of all Democratic U.S. Presidents except her husband, Rosalynn wrote operational head of the DNC Dan Fowler a note requesting they remove her name from its membership rolls.

In April, Carter attended the funeral of Richard Nixon. In May, Carter joined four other former First Ladies and Hillary Clinton at a gala benefit in Washington aimed at raising more than $1 million toward a new National Garden. In August 1994, the Carters organized a Habitat for Humanity crew for the rebuilding of the house of family friend Annie Mae after it had been destroyed in a flood the previous month.

Carter attended the April 1997 two-day event for the revamped Gerald R. Ford Presidential Museum. In November, Carter attended the dedication ceremony for the George H. W. Bush Presidential Library and Museum at Texas A&M University.

In October 1999, Carter, Lady Bird Johnson, Betty Ford, and Barbara Bush made a joint appearance at an event hosted by the Charles A. Dana Foundation to mark the foundation's fiftieth anniversary. The four each received the Distinguished Achievement Award, and were asked to choose a recipient for a $100,000 foundation grant. Carter chose the mental health program at the Carter Center.

As the Clinton presidency neared its end, activists arranged for a letter to President Clinton urging him to declare a moratorium on federal executions before he left office. The Carters signed a separate letter in support of the activists, arguing the moral authority of the US would be diminished by a federal execution.

==== 2000s ====
The Carters stopped associating with the Southern Baptist Convention in 2000 after it adopted language that prohibited women from being pastors, told wives to be submissive to their husbands, and ceased identifying Jesus Christ as "the criterion by which the Bible is to be interpreted." In August, the Carters attended the opening night of the 2000 Democratic National Convention in Los Angeles, where a film of the former president was shown. To celebrate the 200th anniversary of the White House, President Clinton invited Lady Bird Johnson, the Fords, the Carters, and the Bushes to dine at the White House in November.

The Carters were driving from their home to Atlanta when news came over the radio of the September 11 attacks. They were intending to have a meeting with their journalism group. On December 4, Carter delivered a speech to the National Press Club.

The Carters traveled to Cuba in May 2002 and met Fidel Castro. It was the highest level visit of American officials since Castro came to power. Former President Carter stated his intention to discuss with Castro "ideals that Rosalynn and I hold dear: peace, human rights, democracy, the alleviation of human suffering." In October, former President Carter was announced as the winner of the 2002 Nobel Peace Prize for his humanitarian efforts. Rosalynn spoke with him about the money that came with the award and they agreed on giving almost all of it to the Carter Center. The Carters also hosted a reception for longtime friend Max Cleland at the Plains Community Center amid his 2002 re-election campaign. Cleland lost to Republican Congressman Saxby Chambliss.

In January 2003, Carter attended the benefit for the 20th anniversary celebration of the Betty Ford Center in Indian Wells, California. In May, Carter was part of a Larry King Live panel on depression.

During the June 5, 2004, christening of the USS Jimmy Carter in Groton, Connecticut, Carter served as the ship sponsor and christened the ship with a bottle of champagne. She went to the state funeral of Ronald Reagan days later. On October 11, 2004, Carter delivered the keynote address at the AAP National Conference & Exhibition, stating that she would favor medical school curricula requiring doctors to have the ability to recognize mental health symptoms and stressing the importance of recognizing symptoms in early childhood.

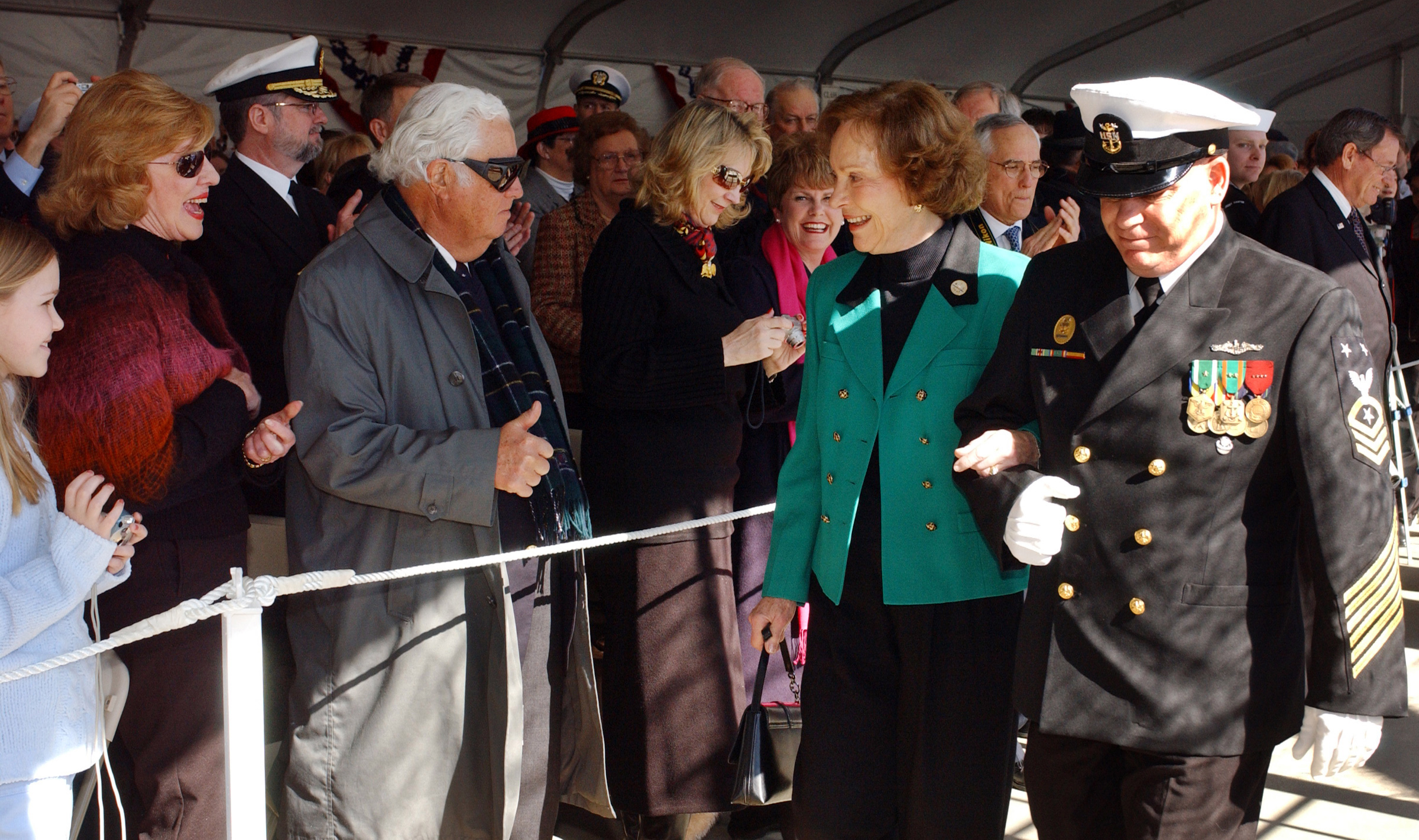
Carter is escorted by Chief of the Boat Master Chief Machinist Mate Shwan D. Burke during the commissioning ceremony for the attack submarine USS Jimmy Carter (SSN 23)

In February 2006, the Carters were in attendance at their son Jack's campaign announcement for the US Senate in Nevada, where the former first couple joined him at the podium. The couple attended the funeral of Coretta Scott King that month at the New Birth Missionary Baptist Church in DeKalb County, Georgia. In December, Carter was ordained a deacon at the Maranatha Baptist Church.

In January 2007, Carter and her husband joined other first ladies and presidents in attending the funeral of Gerald Ford, and six months later attended Lady Bird Johnson's as well. In a 2007 interview shortly before her 80th birthday, Carter said she would continue keeping a full schedule despite wanting to curtail it due to her advancing age, and that she had planned to lower her workload, but failed to do so because she still did not "want to miss anything."

In August 2008, the Carters attended the 2008 Democratic National Convention in Denver, Colorado, where they greeted House Speaker Nancy Pelosi. Following the election, in which Barack Obama defeated John McCain, Rosalynn gave his wife Michelle advice on raising children in the White House.

In March 2009, the Carters met with National Security Advisor James L. Jones for a "general briefing". Carter was present for the April 21, 2009, signing by President Barack Obama of the Edward M. Kennedy Serve America Act. The Carters attended the funeral of Ted Kennedy in August.

==== 2010s and 2020s ====
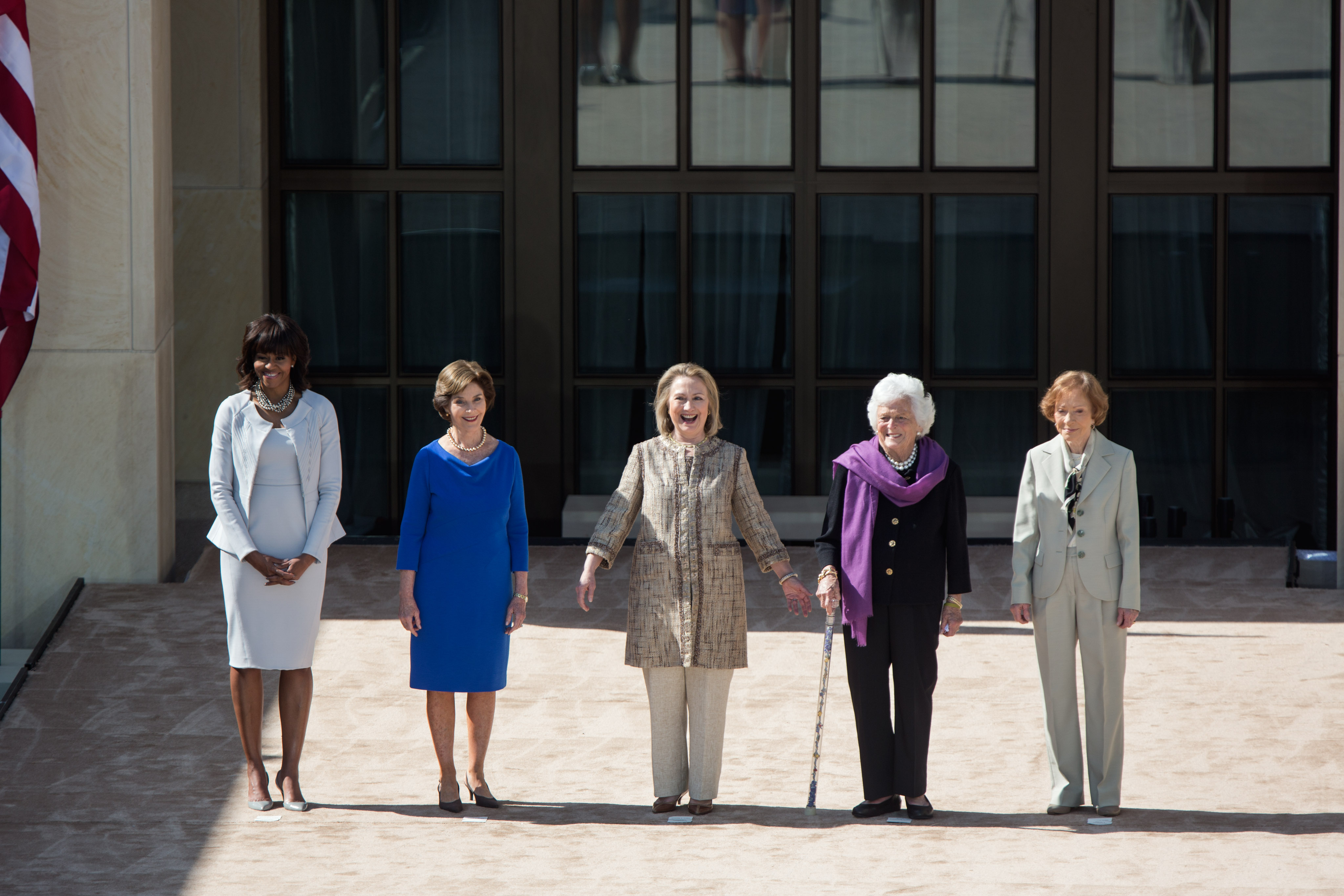
Rosalynn Carter with former first ladies Barbara Bush, Hillary Clinton, Laura Bush, and First Lady Michelle Obama during the dedication of the George W. Bush Presidential Library and Museum on the campus of Southern Methodist University in Dallas, Texas, on April 25, 2013

In 2010, Carter criticized television crime dramas that portrayed mentally ill people as violent, when in fact they were more prone to being victims of crime. On May 7, 2010, she attended the Michelle Obama-hosted Mother's Day Tea at the White House, and was joined by her granddaughter Sarah and infant great-granddaughter. In August 2010, the Carters traveled to Pyongyang in an attempt to secure the release of Aijalon Mahli Gomes, who was arrested after he crossed the border from China into North Korea. Kim Kye-gwan greeted the two when they arrived, and the meeting was seen by professor Kim Sung-han as a symbolization of "North Korea's intention to shift attention to the denuclearization issue."

In February 2011, Carter served as the lead speaker at the Washington University's Brown School of Social Work at Graham Chapel. In July, Carter delivered a eulogy at the funeral of Betty Ford. In November, as the US faced its largest measles outbreak in 15 years, Carter called on parents to aid in dispelling rumors about infant vaccinations: "I know people who don't have their babies immunized think they're doing it for the good of the child. But the good of the child is to not have these terrible diseases."

Carter attended a speech given by Georgia National Guard's Colonel Brent Bracewell in the morning hours of October 25, 2012. Carter gave out the Georgia Paraprofessional Caregiver of the Year, Volunteer Caregiver of the Year, Family Caregiver of the Year, and an award with her namesake, the Rosalynn Carter Leadership in Caregiving Award later that day and expressed happiness in the amount of progress that had been made "since we started."

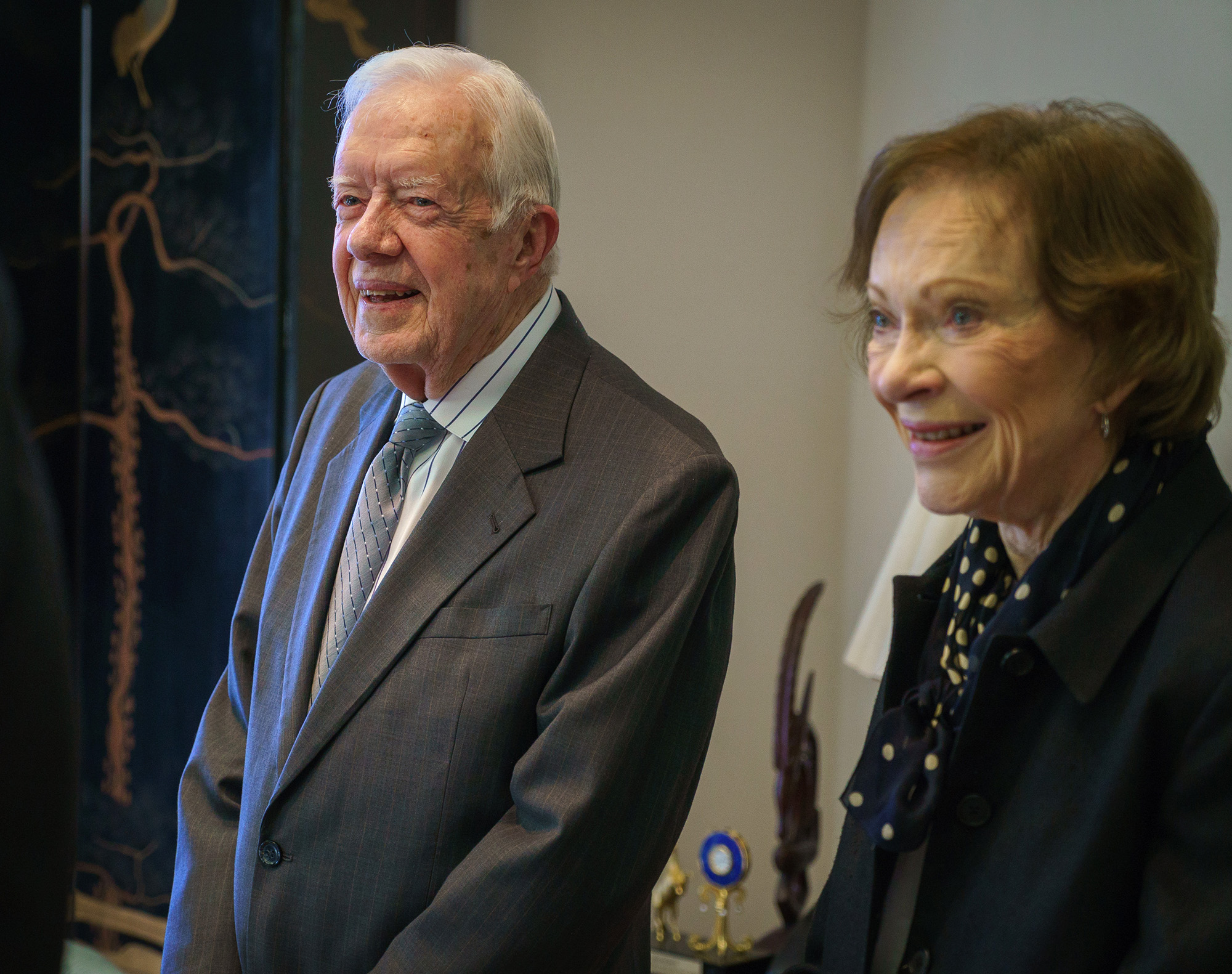
Jimmy and Rosalynn Carter at The Carter Center, 2016

On April 25, 2013, Carter attended the dedication of the George W. Bush Presidential Library and Museum with her husband and other former first ladies and presidents. In October 2013, Carter spoke about her confidence in the American people and her lack of confidence in the government on the issue of the income gap in the United States. Carter saw "one of the greatest disappointments" corrected in November 2013 when Health and Human Services Secretary Kathleen Sebelius announced that the Obama administration had passed a mental health insurance rule. She said she was "shaking" upon learning that the new government rules required equal treatment for mental health care. She and her husband were saddened by the death of Nelson Mandela.

In 2013, Rosalynn traveled to the neighborhood of Queens Village in New York City to help with 5 housing construction projects. Jimmy Carter, Chip Carter, and Chip's wife Becky also traveled to New York with her to volunteer.

In 2014, the Carters helped build 20 houses in east Fort Worth. Trinity Habitat COO Christine Panagopoulos was with the former first couple and remembered Rosalynn saying "it reminded her so much of Plains, because it was a small tight knit community of a few house." Also that year, their grandson Jason Carter ran for Governor of Georgia. In October, Rosalynn gave an interview noting the deteriorating conditions of education and healthcare in Georgia and stated that her grandson would not be beholden to lobbyists. She added, "I want everybody to go out and vote, so I'm working on getting the vote out, and letting people know how important this election is." Weeks later, she joined him for a lunch at The Varsity on West Broad Street in between his appearances in Augusta and Norcross. A month later, he lost the election to incumbent Nathan Deal.

In August 2015, Jimmy announced his cancer diagnosis, stating that it had spread throughout his body. At the time of the announcement, Betty Pope, cousin of the former president, attested to Rosalynn's strength and voiced her belief that the former first lady would remain committed to her husband. Carter made her first public comments about the illness a month later in September, saying, "In spite of what's going on, it's been kind of wonderful just to know we have that kind of support, and also Jimmy's attitude is helping." In November 2015, she and her husband traveled to Memphis, Tennessee where they assisted in construction for the town's Habitat for Humanity affiliate.

In January 2016, Jimmy Carter confirmed that he was having regular treatments and said of Rosalynn at the time, "Her support has helped me through the last 69 years since we've been married in everything I've ever tried. Of course, when I was ill and thought I might die at any time, she was there for me." Carter attended the March 11, 2016, funeral of Nancy Reagan at the Ronald Reagan Presidential Library in Simi Valley, California. In July 2016, Carter endorsed Proposition 62, which would abolish the death penalty in California, releasing a joint statement with her husband in support of the measure. She voted for Bernie Sanders in the Democratic presidential primary of that year. Carter differed from her husband in believing Russia had interfered with determining the results of the general election.

The Carters attended the inauguration of Donald Trump in January 2017. The Carters traveled to Winnipeg in July to aid Habitat for Humanity in building 150 houses within a week. Jimmy Carter became dehydrated while working and was released from the hospital. The Carter Center released a statement that the couple expressed "their appreciation for the many well-wishes he received worldwide." Teberh Zeru, who worked with the couple, called them "very kind people" and credited the pair and Habitat with allowing her to live a comfortable life.

Upon the death of Barbara Bush on April 17, 2018, Carter became the oldest living former first lady. Her recovery from surgery left her unable to attend Bush's funeral, but she attended the funeral of Bush's husband, George H. W. Bush, seven months later. In May 2019, Carter and Bill Jallah wrote an op-ed on a global mental health revolution. They called for putting pressure on governments and the private sector for the prioritizing of mental health care reform and the need for "a chorus of authentic, united voices of people who understand these conditions to push for urgent action, funding, legislation, and beneficial policies." In September 2019, during an event hosted by the Carters, Rosalynn stated that Trump encouraged racism with his rhetoric. On October 17, she became the longest-married former first lady.

In March 2020, Jimmy, Rosalynn, and Jason Carter all signed a statement by the former president requesting that donors give to the coronavirus response rather than to the Carter Center, and furthering that the known behaviors of Covid-19 made it a "global threat to our physical and economic health". The Carters endorsed Joe Biden for president at the 2020 Democratic National Convention in a pre-recorded message. Rosalynn praised Biden as recognizing "the challenges facing our families and has the heart and the power to make life better for all Americans" and noted the Bidens had worked with them to aid unpaid caregivers during the pandemic. Biden won the election, and ahead of his inauguration, a spokeswoman for the Carter Center confirmed that while the couple would not attend, they had sent Biden and Vice President-elect Kamala Harris their well-wishes. In February, Pastor Tony Lowden of the Maranatha Baptist Church announced that the Carters had returned to attending services in person after receiving their vaccination shots against COVID-19. The social distancing requirements forced the couple to end their tradition of taking pictures with visitors at the end of worship. In April 2021, the Bidens visited the Carters at their home in Plains. In July, the Carters celebrated their 75th wedding anniversary, becoming the first presidential couple to do so.

=== Author ===
Shortly after leaving office, Carter signed with Houghton Mifflin for the writing of her autobiography. Writing began within the first months of her retirement. Carter's memoir, First Lady from Plains, was released in 1984. The book was well-received, with Phil Gailey calling it "probably the most useful to those still trying to understand Jimmy Carter" of the four memoirs of the Carters, Hamilton Jordan, and Jody Powell. Lucille Deview noted that Carter wrote of "many historic events with her warm reminiscences" and opined that the book's sole flaw would be Carter's "almost desperate yearning to justify everything in her husband's presidency -- a wish to have all Americans love the man they turned out of office." First Lady From Plains was a bestseller in the non-fiction category. Mark Updegrove wrote that her memoir, and that of her husband, Keeping Faith: Memoirs of a President, succeeded in "boosting the bank account and spirits of their authors."

In 1987, the Carters wrote Everything to Gain: Making the Most of the Rest of Your Life. The book was the first the Carters had written together and saw their conflicting writing styles and manner of working clash. Former President Carter admitted the two were both strong-willed, and said of his wife, "If Rosalynn wrote something, it was sacred. It was like she just came down off Mount Sinai with it. It was painful to her if I suggested that we change a few words." The two also disagreed on how personal the book would be, and eventually became so strained that their communication became limited to their word processors. The Washington Post described it as "a curious production, half memoir and half self-help book", and concluded that much of the advice was not unique to the book, saying it raised the question "Was this book really necessary?" A United Press International review remarked that the result of their collaboration was "an uneven style -- her contributions warm and personal, his detailed but dry. For readers wanting to know more about the lives of the authors, the temptation is to skip ahead to the parts by Rosalynn."

In 1994, Carter and Susan K. Golant wrote Helping Yourself Help Others: A Book for Caregivers. Frances Well Burck called the book useful due to Carter's "focus on both the burdens and the gifts" of caregiving and credited Carter and Golant with offering "solid and sensible recommendations for change, ranging from the development of training programs, networks and resource centers to campaigns to socialize men for broader roles and sensitize professionals to caregivers' needs." Twenty years after its publication, the New York Times would cite it as one of the five books that made caregiving more manageable.

In 1998, Carter and Golant wrote Helping Someone with Mental Illness: A Compassionate Guide for Family, Friends, and Caregivers. When she traveled to Fort Wayne, Carter said the topic of mental illness "is so important to me, and it needs to be important to everybody because of the prevalence of it. So many people suffer unnecessarily when they could get help."

In 2010, Carter, Golant, and Kathyyn E. Cade wrote Within Our Reach: Ending the Mental Health Crisis. In speaking at the Ford Presidential Museum during the book's promotion, Carter acknowledged the government was doing a better job providing services to veterans with PTSD, but more work was needed to support programs for those with mental illnesses: "You can get all the money you want for jails and prisons. Jails and prisons are the largest mental institutions in the country. You can't get money for mental health programs."

== Personal life ==
=== Marriage and family ===
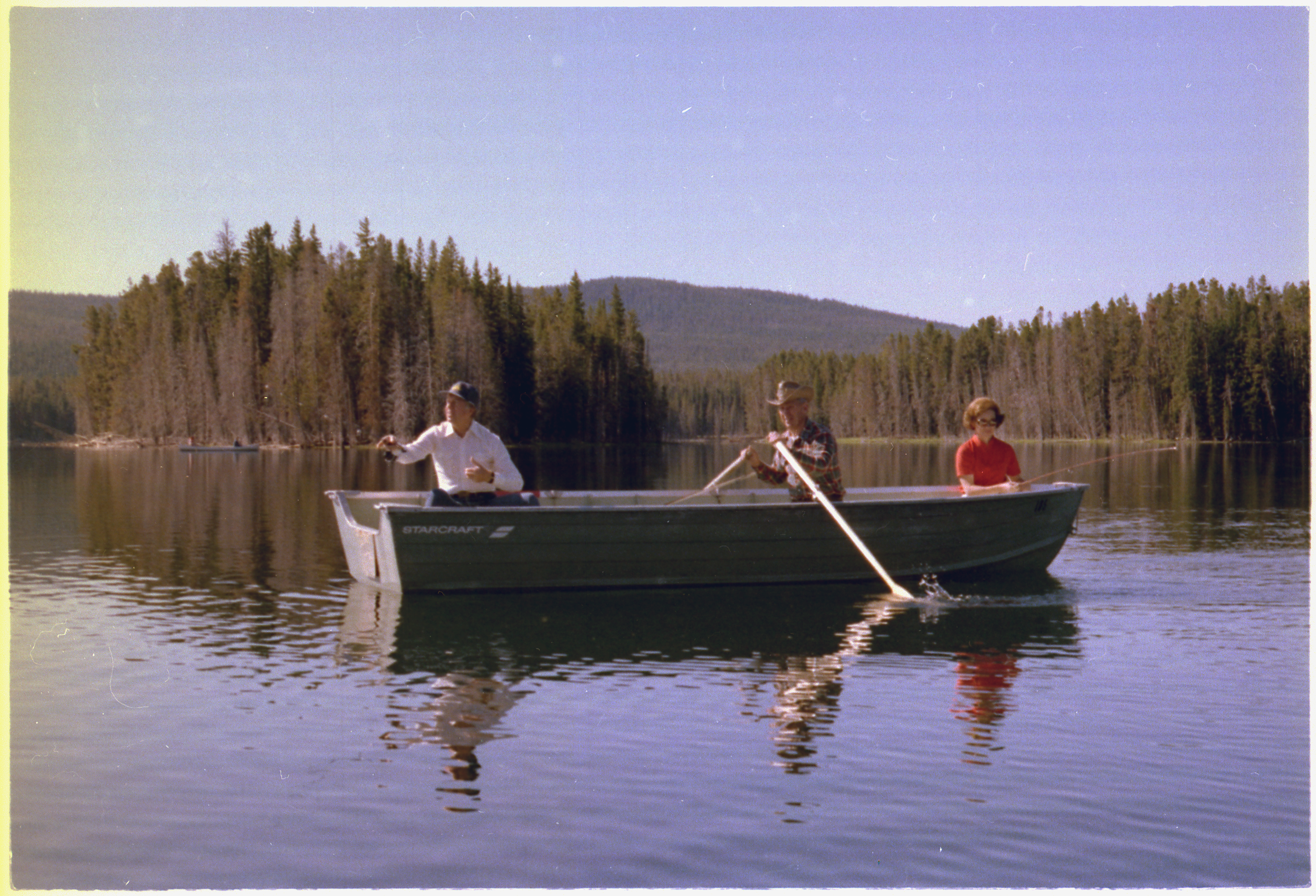
Carter and her husband fishing in 1978

Their families were already acquainted when Rosalynn first dated Jimmy Carter in 1945 while he was attending the United States Naval Academy at Annapolis. She became attracted to him after seeing a picture of him in his Annapolis uniform. The two were riding in the back seat of the car of Ruth Carter Stapleton's boyfriend when Jimmy surprised Rosalynn by kissing her. This was the first time that Rosalynn had ever allowed a boy to do so on the first date. Rosalynn agreed to marry Jimmy in February 1946 when she went to Annapolis with his parents. The two scheduled their marriage to take place in July, and kept the arrangement secret. Rosalynn resisted telling her mother she had chosen to marry instead of continuing her education. On July 7, 1946, they married in Plains. Their marriage caused Rosalynn to cancel her plans to attend Georgia State College for Women, where she had planned to study interior design.

The couple had four children: John William "Jack" (b. 1947), James Earl "Chip" III (b. 1950), Donnel Jeffrey "Jeff" (b. 1952), and Amy Lynn (b. 1967). Due to Jimmy's military duties, the first three were born in different parts of the country and away from Georgia. During that time, Rosalynn enjoyed the independence she had gained from raising the children on her own. However, their relationship faced its first major crisis when she opposed Jimmy's resigning to return to Plains in 1953 after he learned his father was dying. Jimmy reflected that she "avoided talking to me as much as possible" as a result of his decision and would interact with him through their children. The Carters were fans of the New York Yankees until the Braves moved to Atlanta. They said they never went to bed arguing with each other.

In 1953, after her husband left the Navy, Rosalynn helped run the family peanut farm and warehouse business, handling accounting responsibilities. Around this time, yearning for another child, the Carters discovered Rosalynn had physical ailments preventing pregnancy. She underwent surgery to remove a large tumor from her uterus 12 years later. Her obstetrician confirmed she could have another child, and their daughter Amy was born thereafter. Rosalynn had different relationships with each member of Jimmy's family. Becoming friends with his sister, who was two years younger than she, Rosalynn gave her dresses she had outgrown. However, she and Jimmy's mother, Lillian Gordy Carter, had difficulty living together.

In later years, the couple rode two and a half miles a day on three-wheel electric scooters, and they read the Bible aloud to each other in Spanish before they went to bed each night.

From 1962 (the year Jimmy was elected to the Georgia State Senate) until her death, she had been active in the political arena. Carter backed Lyndon B. Johnson in the 1964 presidential election, which she stated put her and her family at odds with other Georgians and caused them to develop a closeness with each other over shared values that others opposed.

Jimmy thoroughly consulted with Rosalynn before he mounted a bid for governor of Georgia in 1966. She traveled to many towns throughout the state with promotional materials, visiting establishments such as radio stations and newspaper offices, and attending meetings of civic organizations. In one encounter, she tried endorsing her husband to a man in Washington, Georgia, the latter declaring his support for Republican candidate Bo Callaway before spitting on her. Rosalynn would later describe the encounter as the "worst political experience of my life." Summarizing the race, Carter wrote, "This was a brief and rushed campaign, but we all learned many things that were helpful to us later." The 1966 gubernatorial campaign saw the beginning of new interactions between the Carters, as Rosalynn was now determined to know her husband's positions on issues and be informed.

The month after the election, Jimmy Carter began campaigning for the 1970 Georgia gubernatorial election. In this campaign, Rosalynn made speeches, which she had not done in prior campaigns. The Carters were separated for most of their travels, and she also began writing speeches for the first time in her involvement in politics. When she met a Carter campaign worker who confided in Rosalynn that her daughter had a mental illness, the sight of the exhausted woman haunted Carter and became a factor in her eventual focus on mental health. Jimmy would later disclose that during the campaign and in the years of his governorship they became "keenly aware of the unmet needs of people in our state who suffered from mental and emotional disabilities."

Mary Prince (an African-American woman wrongly convicted of murder, and later pardoned) was Amy's nanny for most of the period from 1971 until Jimmy Carter's presidency ended, partly thanks to Rosalynn's belief in Prince's innocence.

=== Other activities ===
Rosalynn and her husband former President Jimmy Carter traveled to Mongolia in 2013 and both Carters fished for taimen.

Rosalynn created the Rosalynn Carter Institute for Caregivers in 1987.

=== Health and death ===
In April 1977, Carter underwent surgery to remove a nonmalignant breast tumor. She underwent a gynecological procedure at Bethesda Naval Hospital in August 1977, which her press secretary Mary Hoyt described as a routine private matter.

On May 30, 2023, the Carter Center announced that Carter had been diagnosed with dementia. The statement also noted that she continued to live at home with her husband – who was in hospice care at the time of the announcement – "enjoying spring and visits with loved ones". On November 17, 2023, Carter entered hospice care herself. Her health had been failing amid a urinary tract infection which had not improved with antibiotics. She died two days later at her home in Plains, Georgia, at age 96.

Jimmy Carter said of his wife following her death, "Rosalynn was my equal partner in everything I ever accomplished." He died thirteen months later on December 29, 2024.

=== Funeral ===
External videos
- Tribute Service for Rosalynn Carter, Glenn Memorial United Methodist Church, Atlanta, Georgia, November 28, 2023, C-SPAN

On November 27, a motorcade which began in Plains arrived in Americus, where Carter's casket was carried from the Phoebe Sumter Medical Center to a waiting hearse by former members of Carter's United States Secret Service detail. The motorcade stopped at Carter's alma mater Georgia Southwestern State University (GSW), where GSW president Neal Weaver and Jennifer Olsen, CEO of the Rosalynn Carter Institute for Caregivers, placed two wreaths near her statue at the university's Rosalynn Carter Health and Human Sciences Complex. The motorcade then traveled via Interstates 75 and 285 to The Carter Center in Atlanta, where she lay in repose at the center's Jimmy Carter Presidential Library and Museum. During this time, a service was held and the public paid their respects.

A tribute service was held at the Glenn Memorial United Methodist Church at Emory University in northeast Atlanta on November 28. The service was televised on all television stations in the Atlanta market, and was also carried on some networks nationally. Jimmy Carter, who was in hospice care, attended, donning a blanket featuring images of Rosalynn and himself and with references to their hometown of Plains. President Joe Biden, First Lady Jill Biden, Vice President Kamala Harris, Second Gentleman Doug Emhoff, and former president Bill Clinton also attended. All living former first ladies, Hillary Clinton, Laura Bush, Michelle Obama, and Melania Trump attended the tribute service. Georgia governor and first lady Brian and Marty Kemp were also in attendance, as well as Atlanta mayor Andre Dickens. In addition to several others, friend and PBS journalist Judy Woodruff offered a spoken tribute. Garth Brooks and Trisha Yearwood performed John Lennon's "Imagine" at the ceremony.

A private funeral was held on November 29 at the Maranatha Baptist Church in Plains, with the Carter family and invited close friends in attendance. Jimmy Carter attended the Plains funeral, where he and their children wore leis to reference the family's time in Hawaii. After a final procession through Plains, Carter was buried during a private service at her residence.

== Awards and honors ==
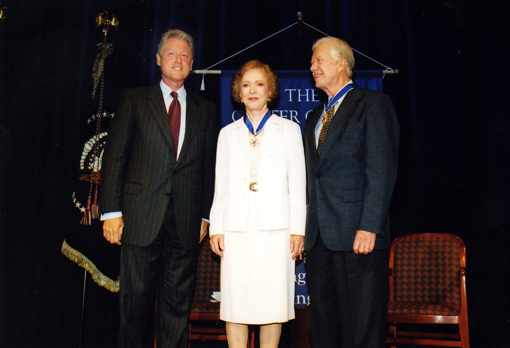
President Bill Clinton awards the Presidential Medal of Freedom to Rosalynn and Jimmy Carter at the Carter Center, 1999

In 1999, Rosalynn and Jimmy Carter received the Presidential Medal of Freedom, the nation's highest civilian honor.

In 2001, Carter was inducted into the National Women's Hall of Fame in Seneca Falls, New York. She became the third first lady inducted into the Hall of Fame, joining Abigail Adams and Eleanor Roosevelt.

Among Carter's many other awards for service are:

- Dorothea Dix Award, Mental Illness Foundation, 1988
- Jefferson Award for Greatest Public Service Benefiting the Disadvantaged, 1996
- Rhoda and Bernard Sarnat International Prize in Mental Health, Institute of Medicine, 2000
- American Peace Award along with Jimmy Carter, 2009

Carter received honorary degrees from the following institutions:

- LL.D., University of Notre Dame, 1987
- D.Litt., Emory University, 1991
- L.H.D., Georgia Southwestern State University, 2001
- Queen's University, 2012

Carter served as distinguished centennial lecturer at Agnes Scott College in Decatur, Georgia, from 1988 to 1992. She was a Distinguished Fellow at the Emory University Department of Women's Studies in Atlanta from 1989 to 2018.

== Books ==
Carter wrote five books:

- First Lady from Plains (autobiography), 1984, ISBN 1-55728-355-9
- Everything to Gain: Making the Most of the Rest of Your Life (with Jimmy Carter), 1987, ISBN 1-55728-388-5
- Helping Yourself Help Others: A Book for Caregivers (with Susan K. Golant), 1994, ISBN 0-8129-2591-2
- Helping Someone with Mental Illness: A Compassionate Guide for Family, Friends, and Caregivers (with Susan K. Golant), 1998, ISBN 0-8129-2898-9
- Within Our Reach: Ending the Mental Health Crisis (with Susan K. Golant and Kathryn E. Cade), 2010, ISBN 978-1-59486-881-8

== Sources ==
- Caroli, Betty Boyd (2010). First Ladies: From Martha Washington to Michelle Obama. Oxford University Press. ISBN 978-0-19-975282-9.
- Carter, Jimmy (2008). Beyond the White House: Waging Peace, Fighting Disease, Building Hope. Simon & Schuster. ISBN 978-1416558811.
- Carter, Jimmy (2010). White House Diary. Farrar, Straus and Giroux. ISBN 978-0374280994.
- Carter, Rosalynn (1994). First Lady from Plains. University of Arkansas Press. ISBN 978-1557283559.
- Coleman, Earl Clark (2004). Welcome Back, Carter: 2004 Democratic Presidential Poll Winner. 1st Book Library. ISBN 978-1414032009.
- Gherman, Beverly (2003). Jimmy Carter. Lerner Pub Group. ISBN 978-0822508168.
- Godbold, E. Stanley (2010). Jimmy and Rosalynn Carter: The Georgia Years, 1924–1974. Oxford University Press. ISBN 978-0-19-975344-4.
- Levin, Bruce Lubotsky (2010). A Public Health Perspective of Women's Mental Health. Springer. ISBN 978-1441915252.
- Lindsay, Rae (2001). The Presidents' First Ladies. Gilmour House. ISBN 978-0965375337.
- Marton, Kati (2002). Hidden Power: Presidential Marriages That Shaped Our History. Anchor. ISBN 978-0385721882.
- O'Brien, Cormac (2005). Secret Lives of the First Ladies: What Your Teachers Never Told You About the Women of the White House. Quirk Books. ISBN 978-1594740145.
- Ronayne, Peter (2001). Never Again?: The United States and the Prevention and Punishment of Genocide since the Holocaust. Rowman & Littlefield Publishers. ISBN 978-0742509221.
- Ryan, Bernard (2006). Jimmy Carter: U.S. President and Humanitarian. Ferguson Pub. ISBN 978-0816059034.
- Watson, Robert P. (2005). Laura Bush: The Report to the First Lady: 2005. Nova Science Publishers. ISBN 978-1594542909.

Honorary titles
Preceded by Hattie Cox	First Lady of Georgia; 1971–1975	Succeeded by Mary Busbee
Preceded by Betty Ford	First Lady of the United States; 1977–1981	Succeeded by Nancy Reagan
