= First Women's Bank (New York) =

First Women's Bank of New York City

The First Women's Bank of New York City was the first bank in New York State dedicated to serving the financial needs of women and was majority owned and operated by women. It opened in 1975 and was part of a broader movement to address the financial needs of women who faced barriers in obtaining credit and financial services from traditional banks. Madeline McWhinney Dale, a former officer at the Federal Reserve Bank, was the bank's first president.

== Founding and early years ==
The First Women's Bank of New York City was conceived as part of a broader movement to address the financial needs of women, who traditional banks often underserved. The idea for the bank was initiated by a group of prominent feminists, including Eileen Preiss, vice chairwoman of the New York State Democratic Committee, and Betty Friedan, a leading figure in the women's liberation movement. Their announcement to establish the First Women's Bank and Trust Company was made in early 1973, following more than a year of planning and effort to secure regulatory approval. Organizers proposed to capitalize the bank through the sale of $4 million in stock. Madeline McWhinney Dale, an officer from the Federal Reserve Bank, was recruited to be the bank's president underscoring its commitment to advancing women's roles within the financial sector. The bank was located in space formerly occupied by a restaurant in the Ritz Tower Hotel located at 111 East 57th Street.

The bank's organizing group also included business leaders, activists, and public figures such as Jane Trahey, president of Trahey Advertising Company; Geraldine Stutz, president of Henri Bendel; Muriel Fox, vice president at Carl Byoir & Associates; Sarah Kovner, president of Arts, Letters & Politics, a public relations firm, Evelyn Lehman, a Wall Street lawyer; New York City Councilwoman Carol Greitzer, Carol Opton, Sheldon Goldstein, and Philip Sills. Their collective experience and influence were crucial in shaping the mission and operations of the bank.

The First Women's Bank open in late 1975 with $3 million in capital and 7,000 shareholders. It offered a full range of services including a 24-hour money machine, a financial library for consumers, and an education program related to investments, insurance, and financial planning. The bank also provided appealing amenities such as streamlined application forms and duplicate copy checkbooks with for a variety of financial services, a conference room available to women's organizations and others.

== Sale and closure ==
First Women's Bank lost its female leadership when it was sold in 1986 and investors appointed Martin A. Simon to be the bank's chairman. The bank's name was changed to First New York Bank for Business in 1989. Federal regulators closed the bank in 1992 selling its federally insured deposits to First Merchants Bank.
