= Bibliography of United States presidential spouses and first ladies =

The following is a list of works about the spouses of presidents of the United States. While this list is mainly about presidential spouses, administrations with a bachelor or widowed president have a section on the individual (usually a family member) that filled the role of First Lady. The list includes books and journal articles written in English after c. 1900 as well as primary sources written by the individual themselves.

Works listed here are cited in the notes or bibliographies of scholarly sources. Each is published by an academic or major press, written by a recognized expert, or substantially reviewed in scholarly journals; borderline cases are omitted. A selection of primary sources are included. Many of the books below carry their own bibliographies; see the Further reading section for other bibliographies, and the External links section for historical sites, academic sites, and museums.

Citations follow APA style. (Note: Entries are in plain text APA 7 format without templates; templates are used only for reviews and notes.) Book have citations to academic journal or mainstream published reviews when available. For books only partly about the subject, relevant chapter or section titles are provided when useful and available. Translators of the original-language edition are included when possible. In cases where a title or name has appeared with more than one English spelling, the most recent published form is used and a footnote documents any earlier title under which the work appeared.

Several presidents were unmarried for all or part of their administration.

- Thomas Jefferson, Andrew Jackson, Chester A. Arthur, and Martin Van Buren were widowed prior to becoming president and remained unmarried during their administration; in these cases, family members acted in the place of First Lady and White House host.
- John Tyler, Benjamin Harrison, and Woodrow Wilson's wives died while they were in office. Tyler and Wilson both remarried during their presidency, while Harrison remarried three years after leaving office.
- James Buchanan was a lifelong bachelor and never married.
- Grover Cleveland entered the White House as a bachelor, but married while in office.

Because this list also serves as a bibliography of first ladies, in these cases, when someone regularly filled the role of White House hostess and informal first lady while the president was unmarried, an entry is provided.

== General works ==
Books

- Abrams, J. E. (2018). First Ladies of the Republic: Martha Washington, Abigail Adams, Dolley Madison, and the Creation of an Iconic American Role. New York: NYU Press.
- Anthony, C. S. (1991). First Ladies: The Saga of the Presidents' Wives and Their Power (2 vols.). New York: William Morrow and Co.
- Beasley, M. H. (2005). First ladies and the Press: The Unfinished Partnership for the Media Age. Evanston, IL: Northwestern University Press.
- Black, A. M. (2019). The First Ladies of the United States of America. Washington D.C.: White House Historical Association.
- Brower, K. A. (2015). The Residence: Inside the Private World of The White House. New York: HarperCollins.
- ——. (2017). First Women: The Grace and Power of America's Modern First Ladies. New York: HarperCollins.
- Burns, L. M. (2008). First Ladies and the Fourth Estate: Press Framing of Presidential Wives. DeKalb, IL: Northern Illinois University Press.
- Caroli, B. (2010). First Ladies: From Martha Washington to Michelle Obama. New York: Oxford University Press.
- Gullan, H. I. (2001). Faith of our Mothers: The Stories of Presidential Mothers from Mary Washington to Barbara Bush. Grand Rapids: William B. Eerdmans. (Note: This contains information on Abigail Adams, Barabra Bush. Unfortunately it does not contain information about Anna Harrison.)
- Hendricks, N. (2015). America's First Ladies: A Historical Encyclopedia and Primary Document Collection. Santa Barbara, CA: ABC-CLIO.
- Marton, K. (2001). Hidden Power: Presidential Marriages That Shaped Our History. New York: Pantheon.
- Schwartz, M. J. (2017). Ties That Bound: Founding First Ladies and Slaves. Chicago: University of Chicago Press.
- Sibley, K. A. S. (2016). A Companion to First Ladies, (Wiley Blackwell Companions to American History). Chichester, MA: Wiley Blackwell. (Note: 760pp. This is the most extensive general work on the First Ladies and the best source for information about lesser known First Ladies.)
- Swain, S. (2016). First Ladies: Presidential Historians on the Lives of 45 Iconic American Women. New York: PublicAffairs.
- Truman, M. (1999). First Ladies. New York: Random House.
- Watson, R. P. (2004). Life in the White House: A Social History of the First Family and the President's House. Albany, NY: State University of New York Press.
- Wead, D. (2004). All The Presidents' Children: Triumph And Tragedy In The Lives Of America's First Families. New York, NY: Simon and Schuster. (Note: This book is include both for the information it contains about Presidential spouses and because several Presidential children stood in as acting First Lady and White House host in the place of a deceased spouse.)

Journal articles

- Black, A. (2001). The Modern First Lady and Public Policy: From Edith Wilson through Hillary Rodham Clinton. OAH Magazine of History, 15(3), pp. 15–20.
- O'Connor, K., Nye, B., & Van Assendelft, L. (1996). Wives in the White House: The Political Influence of First Ladies. Presidential Studies Quarterly, 26(3), pp. 835–853.
- Parry-Giles, S., & Blair, D. (2002). The Rise of the Rhetorical First Lady: Politics, Gender Ideology, and Women's Voice, 1789-2002. Rhetoric and Public Affairs, 5(4), pp. 565-599.
- Sheeler, K. H. (2013). Remembering the Rhetorical First Lady. Rhetoric and Public Affairs, 16(4), pp. 767–782.
- Watson, R. (1997). The First Lady Reconsidered: Presidential Partner and Political Institution. Presidential Studies Quarterly, 27(4), pp. 805–818.
- Watson, R. (2001). The "White Glove Pulpit": A History of Policy Influence by First Ladies. OAH Magazine of History, 15(3), pp. 9–14.
- Watson, R. (2003). "Source Material": Toward the Study of the First Lady: The State of Scholarship. Presidential Studies Quarterly, 33(2), pp. 423–441.

== Specific works ==
=== Martha Washington ===
Martha Washington, née Dandridge; (born June 2, 1731 – died May 22, 1802); (in position April 30, 1789 – March 4, 1797); The wife of George Washington.

Books

- Berkin, C. (2009). Revolutionary Mothers: Women in the Struggle for America's Independence. New York: Vintage Books.
- Brady, P. (2014). Martha Washington: An American Life. New York: Penguin Books.
- Bryan, H. (2002). Martha Washington: First Lady of Liberty. New York: Wiley.
- Chadwick, B. (2007). The General & Mrs. Washington: The Untold Story of a Marriage and a Revolution. Naperville, Ill: Sourcebooks.
- Fraser, F. (2015). The Washingtons: George and Martha. "Join'd by Friendship, Crown'd by Love". New York: Knopf.
- Norton, M. B. (1980). Liberty's Daughters: The Revolutionary Experience of American Women, 1750–1800. Glenview: Scott, Foresman & Co.

Biographies of George Washington with significant information about Martha Washington

- Chernow, R. (2010). Washington: A life. New York: Penguin Press.
- Flexner, J. T. (1965). George Washington (4 vols.). Boston: Little, Brown and Company.

Journal articles

- Watson, R. (2000). Remembering Martha. OAH Magazine of History, 14(2), pp. 54–56.

Primary sources

- Fields, J. E. (1994). Worthy Partner: The Papers of Martha Washington. Westport, CT: Greenwood Press.
- Martha Washington letters. Collaborative project of George Washington's Mount Vernon and the Center for History and New Media.
- Washington, G. (1997). George Washington: Writings (Library of America Founders Collection) (J. H. Rhodehamel, Ed.).. New York: Penguin Random House.

=== Abigail Adams ===
Abigail Adams, née Smith; (born November 22, 1744 – died October 28, 1818); (in position March 4, 1797 – March 4, 1801); The wife of John Adams. The mother of John Quincy Adams and grandmother of Charles Francis Adams Sr.

Books

- Akers, C. W. (2007). Abigail Adams: A Revolutionary American Woman (3rd edition). New York: Pearson Longman.
- Barker-Benfield, G.J. (2010). Abigail and John Adams: The Americanization of Sensibility. Chicago, IL: University of Chicago Press.
- Ellis, Joseph J. (2010). First Family: Abigail and John Adams. New York: Alfred A. Knopf.
- Gelles, E. B. (2009). Abigail and John: Portrait of a Marriage. New York: William Morrow.
- ——. (2010). Portia: The World of Abigail Adams. Bloomington, IN: Indiana University Press.
- ——. (2017). Abigail Adams: A Writing Life. New York: Routledge.
- Gullan, H. I. (2001). Faith of our Mothers: The Stories of Presidential Mothers from Mary Washington to Barbara Bush. Grand Rapids: William B. Eerdmans.
- Holton, W. (2009). Abigail Adams: A Life. New York: Free Press. (Note: Winner of the 2010 Bancroft Prize.)
- Kaminski, J. P. (Ed.). (2009). The Quotable Abigail Adams. Cambridge, MA: Belknap Press.
- Keller, R. S. (1994). Patriotism and the Female Sex: Abigail Adams and the American Revolution. Brooklyn, N.Y: Carlson.
- Levin, P. L. (2001). Abigail Adams: A Biography. New York: St. Martin's Press.
- Nagel, P. C. (1987). The Adams Women: Abigail and Louisa Adams, Their Sisters and Daughters. New York: Oxford University Press.
- Norton, M. B. (1980). Liberty's Daughters: The Revolutionary Experience of American Women, 1750–1800. Glenview: Scott, Foresman & Co.
- Whitney, J. (2013). Abigail Adams. London: Harrap.
- Withey, L. (1981). Dearest Friend: A Life of Abigail Adams. New York: Atria Simon & Schuster.

Biographies of John Adams with significant information about Abigal Adams

- McCullough, D. G. (2001). John Adams. New York: Simon & Schuster.

Journal articles

- Crane, E. (1999). Political Dialogue and the Spring of Abigail's Discontent. The William and Mary Quarterly, 56(4), pp. 745–774.
- Crane, E. (2007). Abigail Adams, Gender Politics, and "The History of Emily Montague". The William and Mary Quarterly, 64(4), third series, pp. 839–844.
- Damiano, S. T. (2017). Writing Women's History Through the Revolution: Family Finances, Letter Writing, and Conceptions of Marriage. The William and Mary Quarterly, 74(4), pp. 697–728.
- Forbes, A. (1936). Abigail Adams, Commentator. Proceedings of the Massachusetts Historical Society, 66, pp. 126–153.
- Gelles, E. B. (1979). Abigail Adams: Domesticity and the American Revolution. The New England Quarterly, 52(4), pp. 500–521.
- Gelles, E. B (1987). A Virtuous Affair: The Correspondence Between Abigail Adams and James Lovell. American Quarterly, 39(2), pp. 252–269.
- Gelles, E. B. (1988). The Abigail Industry. The William and Mary Quarterly, 45(4), pp. 656–683.
- Gelles, E. B. (1996). Bonds of Friendship: The Correspondence of Abigail Adams and Mercy Otis Warren. Proceedings of the Massachusetts Historical Society, 108, pp. 35–71.
- Gelles, E. B. (2006). The Adamses Retire. Early American Studies 4(1), pp. 1–15.
- Holton, W. (2007). Abigail Adams, Bond Speculator. The William and Mary Quarterly, 64(4), third series, pp. 821–838.
- Hutson, J. (1975). Women in the Era of the American Revolution: The Historian as Suffragist. The Quarterly Journal of the Library of Congress, 32(4), pp. 290–303.
- McCullough, D. (2001). Abigail in Paris. Massachusetts Historical Review, 3, pp. 1–18.
- Musto, D. (1981). The Adams Family. Proceedings of the Massachusetts Historical Society, 93, pp. 40–58.
- Ryerson, R. (1988). The Limits of a Vicarious Life: Abigail Adams and Her Daughter. Proceedings of the Massachusetts Historical Society, 100, pp. 1–14.
- Shields, D. S., & Fredrika J. T. (2015). The Court of Abigail Adams. Journal of the Early Republic 35(2), pp. 227–235.

Primary sources

- * Adams, J. (1997). John Adams: Writings (2 vols.) (Library of America Founders Collection) (G. S. Wood, Ed.). New York: Penguin Random House.
- Adams, J., Cappon, L. J. (2012). The Adams-Jefferson Letters: The Complete Correspondence Between Thomas Jefferson and Abigail and John Adams. Chapel Hill: The University of North Carolina Press.
- Adams, J., Adams, A., & Shuffelton, F. (Ed.). (2004). The letters of John and Abigail Adams. New York: Penguin Books.
- The Adams Family Papers. The Massachusetts Historical Society.

=== Martha Wayles Skelton Jefferson ===
Martha Jefferson, née Wayles; (born October 19 or 30, 1748 – died September 6, 1782); (in position: never); The wife of Thomas Jefferson. Martha Jefferson died before her husband assumed the presidency, so she never served as first lady. Since she died young (age 33) comparatively little is written about her independent of biographies of Thomas Jefferson. (Note: While most biographies of Jefferson contain some information about his personal life, the biographies listed here contain substantial information about his personal life and details about his wife.) Her daughter Martha served as informal first lady (see below).

Books

- Holowchak, M. (2018). Jefferson and Women. Charlottesville, VA: Thomas Jefferson Heritage Society.
- Hyland, W. G. (2014). Martha Jefferson: An intimate life with Thomas Jefferson. Lanham, MD: Rowman Littlefield.
- Kukla, J. (2008). Mr. Jefferson's Women. New York: Vintage Books.
- Malone, D. (1993). Jefferson the Virginian. Boston: Little, Brown and Company. (Original work published 1948).
- William G. Hyland (1993). Jr. Martha Jefferson: An Intimate Life with Thomas Jefferson

Fiction books

- Kelly Joyce Neff. (1997) Dear Companion: The Inner Life of Martha Jefferson

Other

- Watson, R. P., & Yon, R. M. (2002). The Unknown Presidential Wife: Martha Wayles Skelton Jefferson. Ripton, VT: Jefferson Legacy Foundation.

=== Martha Jefferson Randolph ===
Martha Jefferson Randolph, née Jefferson; (born September 27, 1772 – died October 10, 1836); (in role: March 4, 1801 – March 4, 1809); She was the eldest daughter of Thomas Jefferson and his wife Martha Wayles Skelton Jefferson. By the time Jefferson was president, she was his only surviving child with his wife. Since Jefferson never remarried, she served as needed in her mother's place as White House hostess and informal first lady during Jefferson's administration. (Note: Since this list also serves as a bibliography of first ladies, this entry is included.)

Books

- Kierner, C. A. (2012). Martha Jefferson Randolph, Daughter of Monticello: Her Life and Times. Chapel Hill, NC: University of North Carolina Press.
- Wead, D. (2004). All The Presidents' Children: Triumph And Tragedy In The Lives Of America's First Families. New York, NY: Simon and Schuster.
- Sibley, K. A. S. (2016). A Companion to First Ladies, (Wiley Blackwell Companions to American History). Chichester, MA: Wiley Blackwell.

Journal articles

- Kerrison, C. (2013). The French Education of Martha Jefferson Randolph. Early American Studies, 11(2), pp. 349–394.

=== Dolley Madison ===
Dolley Madison, née Payne; (born May 20, 1768 – died July 12, 1849; (in position: March 4, 1809 – March 4, 1817); The wife of James Madison. There is a variety of ways her first name is spelled; depending on the era of writing a different form of her first name may be used. Dollie, appears to have been her given name at birth. Her birth was registered with the New Garden Friends Meeting as Dolley and her will of 1841 uses Dolly.

Books

- Allgor, C. (2000). Parlor Politics: In Which the Ladies of Washington Help Build a City and a Government. Charlottesville: University Press of Virginia.
- Allgor, C. (2006). A Perfect Union: Dolley Madison and the Creation of the American Nation. New York: Henry Holt & Co.
- Allgor, C. (2012). Dolley Madison: The Problem of National Unity. Boulder, CO: Westview Press.
- Côté, R. N. (2005). Strength and Honor: The Life of Dolley Madison. Mt. Pleasant, SC: Corinthian Books.
- Howard, H. (2012). Mr. and Mrs. Madison's War: America's First Couple and the Second War of Independence. New York: Bloomsbury.

Journal articles

- Allgor, C. (2000). "Queen Dolley" Saves Washington City. Washington History, 12(1), pp. 54–69.
- Scofield, M. E. (2012). Yea or Nay to Removing the Seat of Government: Dolley Madison and the Realities of 1814 Politics. The Historian, 74(3), pp. 449–466.
- Schulman, H. (2010). "A Constant Attention": Dolley Madison and the Publication of the Papers of James Madison, 1836-1837. The Virginia Magazine of History and Biography, 118(1), pp. 40–70.
- Schulman, H. (2011). Madison v. Madison: Dolley Payne Madison and Her Inheritance of the Montpelier Estate, 1836-38. The Virginia Magazine of History and Biography, 119(4), pp. 350–393.
- Todd, J., Todd, D., Madison, J., & Sifton, P. (1963). "What a Dread Prospect...": Dolley Madison's Plague Year. The Pennsylvania Magazine of History and Biography, 87(2), pp. 182–188.

Primary sources

- Cutts, L. B. (1970). Memoirs and Letters of Dolly Madison. Boston: Houghton Mifflin.
- Madison, J. (1995). James Madison: Writings (Library of America Founders Collection) (J. N. Rakvoe, Ed.).. New York: Penguin Random House.
- Mattern, D. B., & Shulman, H. C. (2003). The Selected Letters of Dolley Payne Madison. Charlottesville: University of Virginia Press.

Biographies of James Madison with significant information about Dolley Madison

- Brookhiser, R. (2013). James Madison. New York: Basic Books.

=== Elizabeth Monroe ===
Elizabeth Jane Monroe, née Kortright; (born June 30, 1768 – died September 23, 1830); (in position: March 4, 1817 – March 4, 1825); The wife of James Monroe.

Books

- Ammon, H. (2008). James Monroe: The Quest for National Identity. Newtown, CT: American Political Biography Press. (Note: A biography of James Madison, contains basic information about Elizabeth Monroe's relationship with James, but nothing about her independent of him.)
- McGrath, T. (2020). James Monroe: A Life. New York: Penguin Random House. (Note: A personal as well as political biography of James Monroe that contains significant information about Elizabeth Monroe.)

=== Louisa Adams ===
Louisa Adams, née Johnson; (born February 12, 1775 – died May 15, 1852); (in position March 4, 1825 – March 4, 1829); The wife of John Quincy Adams. The mother of Charles Francis Adams (1807—1886). The first First Lady to be born outside of the United States or the American colonies.

Books

- Nagel, P. (1987). The Adams Women: Abigail and Louisa Adams, Their Sisters and Daughters Cambridge, MA: Harvard University Press.
- O'Brien, M. (2010). Mrs. Adams in Winter: A Journey in the Last Days of Napoleon. New York: Farrar, Straus and Giroux.
- Thomas, L. (2016). Louisa: The Extraordinary Life of Mrs. Adams. New York: Penguin Press.

Journal articles

- Allgor, C. (1997). "A Republican in a Monarchy": Louisa Catherine Adams in Russia. Diplomatic History, 21(1), pp. 15–43.
- Butterfield, L. (1974). Tending a Dragon-Killer: Notes for the Biographer of Mrs. John Quincy Adams. Proceedings of the American Philosophical Society, 118(2), pp. 165–178.

Primary sources

- Adams, J. Q. (2017). John Quincy Adams: Writings (2 vols.) (Library of America Founders Collection) (D. Waldstreicher, Ed.).. New York: Penguin Random House.
- Adams, L. C., et al. (2013). The Adams Papers. Diary and Autobiographical Writings of Louisa Catherine Adams. Cambridge, MA: Belknap Press.
- Hogan, M. A., Lane, L. (2014). A Traveled First Lady: Writings of Louisa Catherine Adams. Cambridge, MA: Belknap Press. ISBN 978-0674048010.

Biographies of John Quincy Adams with significant information about Louisa Adams

- Nagel, P. C. (2012). John Quincy Adams: A Public Life, A Private Life. New York: Knopf. (Note: A personal and political biography of John Quincy Adams that contains significant information about Louisa Adams.)

=== Rachel Jackson ===
Rachel Jackson, née Donelson; June 15, 1767 – December 22, 1828; The wife of Andrew Jackson. The aunt of Emily Donelson (1807—1836). Rachel Jackson died just after Jackson's election but before his inauguration as president; she never served as First Lady. The role was assumed by her niece, Emily Donelson until 1834 and from then by Sarah Yorke Jackson, Jackson's daughter-in-law. She was the final first lady to be born before the Declaration of Independence. (Note: All biographies of Andrew Jackson mention Rachel and will focus on the circumstances of her first marriage and the aftermath. The biographies below go into more detail than this single aspect of her life.)

Biographies of Andrew Jackson with significant content on Rachel Jackson

- Brands, H. W. (2005). Andrew Jackson: His Life and Times. New York: Knopf.
- Cheathem, M. R. (2007). Old Hickory's Nephew: The political and private struggles of Andrew Jackson Donelson. Baton Rouge, LA: Louisiana State University Press. ISBN 978-0807132388.
- Remini, R. V. (1977/1981). Andrew Jackson and the Course of American Empire (Vols. 1–2). New York: Harper & Row. (Note: Contains a significant amount of information about Rachel Jackson and the Donelson family.)
- Sibley, K. A. S. (2016). A Companion to First Ladies, (Wiley Blackwell Companions to American History). Chichester, MA: Wiley Blackwell.
- Spence, R. D. (2017). Andrew Jackson Donelson: Jacksonian and Unionist. Nashville: Vanderbilt University Press. ISBN 978-0826521637. (Note: Andrew Jackson Donelson was the nephew of Rachel Jackson. She and Andrew adopted him at a young age and raised him. This book has information about Rachel from the period of his upbringing.)

=== Emily Donelson ===
Emily Donelson, née none; (born June 1, 1807 – died December 19, 1836); (in position March 4, 1829 – November 26, 1834); The niece of Andrew Jackson. She served as acting First Lady and White House host in the place of her mother, Rachel Jackson. (Note: Although she did not live to become First Lady, many general works about First Ladies contain information about her.)

Books

- Burke, P. W. (1941). Emily Donelson of Tennessee (2 vols.). Richmond, VA: Garrett and Massie.
- Sibley, K. A. S. (2016). A Companion to First Ladies, (Wiley Blackwell Companions to American History). Chichester, MA: Wiley Blackwell.
- Wead, D. (2004). All The Presidents' Children: Triumph And Tragedy In The Lives Of America's First Families. New York, NY: Simon and Schuster.

=== Sarah Yorke Jackson ===
Sarah Jackson, née Yorke; (born July 16, 1803 – died August 23, 1887); (in position November 26, 1834 – March 4, 1837); The daughter-in-law of Andrew Jackson; she served as White House hostess and acting First Lady in the place of her mother in law.

Relatively little has been written about Sarah York Jackson. For information about her, see the bibliography of Andrew Jackson § Kinship networks, personal life, biographical dictionaries.

=== Hannah Van Buren ===
Hannah Van Buren, née Hoes; (born March 8, 1783 – died February 5, 1819); The wife of Martin Van Buren. She died before Van Buren was elected president, so never held the position of First Lady. Acting as First Lady and White House host in her place was her daughter in law, Sarah Van Buren. Because she died at age 35 before Martin Van Buren became widely known, very little is known about her.

Books

- Black, A. M. (2019). The First Ladies of the United States of America. Washington D.C.: White House Historical Association.
- Sibley, K. A. S. (2016). A Companion to First Ladies, (Wiley Blackwell Companions to American History). Chichester, MA: Wiley Blackwell.

Primary sources

- The Papers of Martin Van Buren at Cumberland University

Relatively little has been written about Hannah Van Buren. For information about her, see the Bibliography of Martin Van Buren.

=== Sarah Van Buren ===
Sarah Angelica Van Buren, née Singleton; February 13, 1818 – December 29, 1877; The daughter in law of Martin Van Buren. She was married to the President's son, Abraham Van Buren and served as acting First Lady and White House host in the place of her mother in law, Hannah Van Buren.

Books

- Sibley, K. A. S. (2016). A Companion to First Ladies, (Wiley Blackwell Companions to American History). Chichester, MA: Wiley Blackwell.
- Wead, D. (2004). All The Presidents' Children: Triumph And Tragedy In The Lives Of America's First Families. New York, NY: Simon and Schuster.

Primary sources

- Angelica Singleton Van Buren Collection at University of South Carolina

Relatively little has been written about Sarah Van Buren. For information about her, see the Bibliography of Martin Van Buren.

=== Anna Harrison ===
Anna Tuthill Harrison, née Symmes; July 25, 1775 – February 25, 1864; The wife of William Henry Harrison and grandmother of Benjamin Harrison. Since Harrison died less than a month into his term in office, she is the individual who spent the shortest time as First Lady. She was too ill to travel from Ohio to Washington, D.C., when her husband became president, so Jane Irwin Harrison, Harrison's daughter-in-law, served as White House hostess during his short time in office.

Relatively little has been written about Anna Harrison. For information about her, see the Bibliography of William Henry Harrison

=== Letitia Tyler ===
Letitia Christian Tyler, née Christian; November 12, 1790 – September 10, 1842; The wife of John Tyler. When John Tyler became the first vice president to ascend to the presidency, Letitia Tyler became First Lady. She was the first of three people to die while in the position.

Journal articles

- Leahy, C. (2006). Torn between Family and Politics: John Tyler's Struggle for Balance. The Virginia Magazine of History and Biography, 114(3), pp. 322–355.

Relatively little has been written about Letitia Tyler. For information about her, see the Bibliography of John Tyler

=== Priscilla Tyler ===
Priscilla Cooper Tyler, née Cooper; June 14, 1816 – December 29, 1889; The daughter in law of John Tyler. She was married to the President's son, Robert Tyler and served as acting First Lady and White House host after the death of her mother in law, Letitia Tyler, from September, 1842 – March, 1844.

Journal articles

- Leahy, C. (2012). Playing Her Greatest Role: Priscilla Cooper Tyler and the Politics of the White House Social Scene, 1841–44. The Virginia Magazine of History and Biography, 120(3), pp. 236–269.

Relatively little has been written about Priscilla Tyler. For information about her, see the Bibliography of John Tyler.

=== Letitia Semple ===
Letitia "Letty" Christian Semple, née Tyler; May 11, 1821 – December 28, 1907; The daughter of John Tyler. She served as acting First Lady and White House host from March, 1844 – June 26, 1844, after her sister in law, Priscilla Tyler left the White House. She was succeeded in the position by Tyler's second wife Julia.

Relatively little has been written about Letitia Semple. For information about her, see the Bibliography of John Tyler.

=== Julia Tyler ===
Julia Gardiner Tyler, née Gardiner; May 4, 1820 – July 10, 1889; The daughter in law of Martin Van Buren. She was the second wife of John Tyler. She served the second shortest period of time as First Lady after Anna Harrison, from June 26, 1844, to March 4, 1845.

Journal articles

- Pugh, E. (1980). Women and Slavery: Julia Gardiner Tyler and the Duchess of Sutherland. The Virginia Magazine of History and Biography, 88(2), pp. 186–202.

Relatively little has been written about Julia Tyler. For information about her, see the Bibliography of John Tyler.

=== Sarah Polk ===
Sarah Polk, née Childress; September 4, 1803 – August 14, 1891; She was the wife of James Polk.

Books

- Bumgarner, J. R. (1997). Sarah Childress Polk: A Biography of the Remarkable First Lady. Jefferson, NC: McFarland.
- Claxton, J. (1972). 88 years with Sarah Polk. New York, NY: Vantage Press. ISBN 978-0533002221.
- Greenberg, A. S. (2019). Lady First: The World of First Lady Sarah Polk. New York: Alfred A. Knopf.

Journal articles

- Bergeron, P. (1987). All in the Family: President Polk in the White House. Tennessee Historical Quarterly, 46(1), pp. 10–20.
- Thweatt, J. (1974). The James K. Polk Papers. Tennessee Historical Quarterly, 33(1), pp. 93–98.
- Wallace, S. (1952). Letters of Mrs. James K. Polk to her Husband. Tennessee Historical Quarterly

Part One: 11(2), pp. 180-191.
Part Two: 11(3), pp. 282-288.

Primary sources

- Digital Collection: James K. Polk Papers. Washington D.C.: The Library of Congress.
- Correspondence Of James K. Polk. Knoxville, TN: The University of Tennessee.

Biographies of James Polk with significant information about Sarah Polk

- Borneman, W. R. (2008). Polk. New York: Random House.

=== Margaret Taylor ===
Margaret "Peggy" Mackall Taylor, née Smith; September 21, 1788 – August 14, 1852; She was the wife of Zachary Taylor.

Relatively little has been written about Margaret Taylor. For information about her, see the Bibliography of Zachary Taylor.

=== Abigail Fillmore ===
Abigail Fillmore, née Powers; March 13, 1798 – March 30, 1853; She was the wife of Millard Fillmore. She was the final first lady to be born in the eighteenth century.

Biographies of Millard Fillmore with significant information on Abigail Fillmore

- Rayback, Robert J. (2015). Millard Fillmore: Biography of a President. Newtown, CT: American Political Biography Press.
- Scarry, R. J. (2001). Millard Fillmore. Jefferson, NC: McFarland & Co.

Relatively little has been written about Abigail Fillmore. For information about her, see the Bibliography of Millard Fillmore.

=== Jane Pierce ===
Jane Means Pierce, née Appleton; March 12, 1806 – December 2, 1863; She was the wife of Franklin Pierce.

Relatively little has been written about Jane Pierce. For information about her, see the Bibliography of Franklin Pierce.

=== Harriet Lane ===
Harriet Rebecca Lane Johnston, née Lane; May 9, 1830 – July 3, 1903; She was the niece of James Buchanan. Buchanan was never married and Harriet Lane acted as First Lady during his presidency.

Relatively little has been written about Harriet Lane. For information about her, see the Bibliography of James Buchanan.

=== Mary Todd Lincoln ===
Mary Todd Lincoln, née Todd; December 13, 1818 – July 16, 1882; She was the wife of Abraham Lincoln.

Books

- Baker, J. H. (1987). Mary Todd Lincoln: A Biography. New York: W.W. Norton & Company.
- Clinton, C. (2010). Mrs. Lincoln: A Life. New York Harper Perennial.
- Ellison, B. B. (2014). The True Mary Todd Lincoln: A Biography. Jefferson, NC: McFarland & Company.
- Emerson, J., & Brust, J. S. (2014). The Madness of Mary Lincoln. Carbondale, IL: Southern Illinois University Press.
- McDermott, S. P. (2015). Mary Lincoln: Southern Girl, Northern Woman. New York: Routledge.
- Neely, M. E., & McMurtry, R. G. (2014). The Insanity File: The Case of Mary Todd Lincoln. Carbondale, IL: Southern Illinois University Press.
- Randall, R. P. (1953). Mary Lincoln: Biography of a Marriage. Boston: Little, Brown and Co.
- Simmons, D. L. (1970). A Rose for Mrs. Lincoln: A Biography of Mary Todd Lincoln. Boston: Beacon.
- Williams, F. J. (2012). The Mary Lincoln Enigma: Historians on America's most controversial First Lady. Carbondale: Southern Illinois University Press.

Journal articles

- Bach, J. (2004). Acts of Remembrance: Mary Todd Lincoln and Her Husband's Memory. Journal of the Abraham Lincoln Association, 25(2), pp. 25–49.
- Baker, J. (1988). Mary Todd Lincoln: Biography as Social History. The Register of the Kentucky Historical Society, 86(3), pp. 203–215.
- Baker, J. (1990). Mary Todd Lincoln: Managing Home, Husband, and Children. Journal of the Abraham Lincoln Association, 11, pp. 1–12.
- Emerson, J. (2010). Mary Lincoln: An Annotated Bibliography. Journal of the Illinois State Historical Society, 103(2), pp. 180–235.
- Emerson, J. (2011). Mary Lincoln: An Annotated Bibliography Supplement. Journal of the Illinois State Historical Society, 104(3), pp. 238–249.
- Holden, C.J. (2004). Review of the book Abraham and Mary Lincoln: A House Divided. Film & History: An Interdisciplinary Journal of Film and Television Studies 34(1), pp. 76–77.
- Neely, M. (1996). The Secret Treason of Abraham Lincoln's Brother-in-Law. Journal of the Abraham Lincoln Association, 17(1), pp. 39–43.
- Scharf, L., & Neely, M. (1988).A House Divided: Mary Todd Lincoln and Her Family. Reviews in American History, 16(2), pp. 227–232.
- Schwartz, T. (2005). Mary Todd's 1835 Visit to Springfield, Illinois. Journal of the Abraham Lincoln Association, 26(1), pp. 42–45.

Primary sources

- Papers of Abraham Lincoln Digital Library. Abraham Lincoln Presidential Library
- Abraham Lincoln Papers at the Library of Congress. Library of Congress Digital Collection
- Robert Todd Lincoln family papers. Library of Congress. (Note: Includes Mary Todd's letters during her confinement at the sanitorium in Bellevue and those following her 1876 release.)
- Manuscripts for: Mary Lincoln. First Ladies National Library.

Biographies of Abraham Lincoln with significant content on Mary Todd Lincoln

- Burlingame, M. (2013). Abraham Lincoln: A Life (2 vols.). Baltimore: The Johns Hopkins University Press
- Donald, D. H. (1995). Lincoln. New York: Simon & Schuster.
- McPherson, J. M. (2009). Abraham Lincoln. Oxford: Oxford University Press.

=== Eliza Johnson ===
Eliza McCardle Johnson, née McCardle; October 4, 1810 – January 15, 1876; She was the wife of Andrew Johnson.

Primary sources

- The papers of Andrew Johnson. Digital Collection, The United States National Archives.
- The papers of Andrew Johnson. Digital Collection, The Library of Congress.

Relatively little has been written about Eliza Johnson. For information about her, see the bibliography of Andrew Johnson § Family and character qualities.

=== Julia Grant ===
Julia Boggs Grant, née Dent; January 26, 1826 – December 14, 1902; She was the wife of Ulysses S. Grant.

Primary sources

- The Personal Memoirs of Ulysses S. Grant
- The papers of Ulysses S. Grant. Mississippi State University.
- The papers of Ulysses S. Grant. Digital Collection, The Library of Congress.
- The papers of Ulysses S. Grant. Digital Collection, The United States National Archives.
- Simon, J. Y., & Catton, B. (1996). The Personal Memoirs of Julia Dent Grant. Carbondale: Southern Illinois University Press.

Biographies of Ulysses S. Grant with significant information about Julia Grant

- Chernow, R. (2017). Grant. New York: Penguin Press. (Note: Contains a great deal of information about both Julia Grant and the Dent family.)

Relatively little has been written about Julia Grant. For information about her, see the Bibliography of Ulysses S. Grant.

=== Lucy Hayes ===
Lucy Webb Hayes, née Webb; August 28, 1831 – June 25, 1889; She was the wife of Rutherford B. Hayes.

Primary sources

- The papers of Rutherford B. Hayes. The Rutherford B. Hayes Library.

Relatively little has been written about Lucy Hayes. For information about her, see the Bibliography of Rutherford B. Hayes.

=== Lucretia Garfield ===
Lucretia Garfield, née Rudolph; April 19, 1832 – March 13, 1918; She was the wife of James A. Garfield.

Primary sources

- The papers of James A. Garfield. The Library of Congress.

Relatively little has been written about Lucretia Garfield. For information about her, see the Bibliography of James A. Garfield.

=== Nell Arthur ===
Nell Arthur, née Herndon; August 30, 1837 – January 12, 1880; She was the wife of Chester A. Arthur, but died two years before he became president, so never assumed the position.

Primary sources

- The papers of Chester Alan Arthur. The Library of Congress.

Relatively little has been written about Nell Arthur. For information about her, see the Bibliography of Chester A. Arthur.

=== Mary Arthur McElroy ===
Mary Arthur McElroy, née Arthur; July 5, 1841— January 8, 1917; She was the sister of Chester A. Arthur; she assumed the role of acting First Lady in the place of Arthur's deceased wife.

Primary sources

- The papers of Chester Alan Arthur. The Library of Congress.

Relatively little has been written about Mary Arthur McElroy. For information about her, see the Bibliography of Chester A. Arthur.

=== Frances Cleveland ===
Frances Clara Cleveland Preston, née Folsom; date – date; She was the wife of Grover Cleveland. She was the youngest person (age 21) to fill the position of First Lady and is one of two who remarried after the deaths of their Presidential husbands and one of two First Ladies to marry a sitting President.

Primary sources

- The papers of Grover Cleveland. The Library of Congress.

Relatively little has been written about Frances Cleveland. For information about her, see the Bibliography of Grover Cleveland.

=== Rose Cleveland ===
Rose Elizabeth Cleveland, née Name; date – date; She was the sister of Grover Cleveland. Since Cleveland entered the White House unmarried, Rose Cleveland served as acting First Lady and White House host until her brother married fourteen months into his first term. She is the only LGBTQ individual to serve in the position of First Lady and White House hostess.

Primary sources

- The papers of Grover Cleveland. The Library of Congress.

Relatively little has been written about Rose Cleveland. For information about her, see the Bibliography of Grover Cleveland.

=== Caroline Harrison ===
Caroline Lavinia Harrison, née Scott; October 1, 1832 – October 25, 1892; She was the wife of Benjamin Harrison.

Primary sources

- The papers of Benjamin Harrison. The Library of Congress.

Relatively little has been written about Caroline Harrison. For information about her, see the Bibliography of Benjamin Harrison.

=== Mary Harrison McKee ===
Mary Harrison McKee, née Harrison; April 3, 1858 – October 28, 1930; She was the daughter of Benjamin Harrison. She assumed the role of acting First Lady after the death of her mother.

Primary sources

- The papers of Benjamin Harrison. The Library of Congress.

Relatively little has been written about Mary Harrison McKee. For information about her, see the Bibliography of Benjamin Harrison.

=== Ida McKinley ===
Ida Saxton McKinley, née Saxton; June 8, 1847 – May 26, 1907; She was the wife of William McKinley.

Books

- Anthony, C. S. (2013). Ida McKinley: The Turn-of-the-Century First Lady through War, Assassination, and Secret Disability. Kent, OH: The Kent State University Press.

Primary sources

- The papers of William McKinley. The Library of Congress.

Relatively little has been written about Ida McKinley. For information about her, see the Bibliography of William McKinley.

=== Edith Roosevelt ===
Edith Kermit Roosevelt, née Carrow; August 6, 1861 – September 30, 1948; She was the wife of Theodore Roosevelt.

Books

- Lewis, L. G. (2013). Edith Kermit Roosevelt: Creating the Modern First Lady. Lawrence, KS: University Press of Kansas.
- Morris, S. J. (2001). Edith Kermit Roosevelt: Portrait of a First Lady. New York: Modern Library.

Primary sources

- The papers of Theodore Roosevelt. The Library of Congress.
- The Theodore Roosevelt Collection. Harvard University.

=== Helen Herron Taft ===
Helen Louise "Nellie" Taft, née Herron; June 2, 1861 – May 22, 1943; She was the wife of William Howard Taft.

Books

- Anthony, C. S. (2007). Nellie Taft: The Unconventional First Lady of the Ragtime Era. New York: HarperCollins.
- Gould, L. L. (2010). Helen Taft: Our Musical First Lady. Lawrence, KS: University Press of Kansas.

Primary sources

- Taft, H. H. (2010). Recollections of Full Years. Charleston, SC: BiblioLife.
- Taft, W. H., & Gould, L. L. (2011). My dearest Nellie: The letters of William Howard Taft to Helen Herron Taft, 1909-1912. Lawrence, KS: University Press of Kansas.
- The papers of William Howard Taft. Library of Congress.

For information about Helen Herron Taft, see the Bibliography of William Howard Taft

=== Ellen Axson Wilson ===
Ellen Louise Axson Wilson, née Axson; May 15, 1860 – August 6, 1914; She was the first wife of Woodrow Wilson. She died in 1914 and was succeeded as First Lady (acting) by her daughter, Margaret.

Biographies of Woodrow Wilson with significant information about Ellen Axson Wilson

- Berg, A. S. (2013). Wilson. New York: Simon & Schuster.
- Bragdon, Henry W. (1967). Woodrow Wilson: the Academic Years. Cambridge, MA: Belknap Press.
- Cooper, John Milton Jr. (2009). Woodrow Wilson. New York: Knopf Doubleday
- Link, A. S. (1947–1965), Wilson (5 vols.). Princeton, NJ: Princeton University Press.
- Mulder, John H. (1978). Woodrow Wilson: The Years of Preparation. Princeton, NJ: Princeton University Press.

Primary sources

- The papers of Woodrow Wilson. Digital Collection, Library of Congress.
- The papers of Woodrow Wilson. The United States National Archives.
- The papers of Woodrow Wilson. Digital Collection, The University of Virginia.
- The papers of Woodrow Wilson. Printed Volumes, Princeton University Press.

=== Margaret Woodrow Wilson ===
Margaret Woodrow Wilson, née Wilson; April 16, 1886 – February 12, 1944; She was the daughter of Woodrow Wilson and filled in for her mother Ellen as acting First Lady until her father remarried in 1915.

Relatively little has been written about Margaret Woodrow Wilson. For information about her, see the Bibliography of Woodrow Wilson.

=== Edith Wilson ===
Edith Wilson, née Bolling; October 15, 1872 – December 28, 1961; She was the second wife of Woodrow Wilson.

Biographies of Woodrow Wilson with significant information about Edith Wilson

- Berg, A. S. (2013). Wilson. New York: Simon & Schuster.
- Cooper, John Milton Jr. (2009). Woodrow Wilson. New York: Knopf Doubleday.
- Levin, P. L. (2001). Edith and Woodrow: The Wilson White House. New York: Scribner.
- Link, A. S. (1947–1965), Wilson (5 vols.). Princeton, NJ: Princeton University Press.

=== Florence Harding ===
Florence Mabel Harding, née Kling; August 15, 1860 – November 21, 1924; She was the wife of Warren G. Harding.

Books

- Anthony, Carl Sferranza (1998). Florence Harding: The First Lady, The Jazz Age, and the Death of America's Most Scandalous President. New York: W. Morrow & Company.
- Sibley, Katherine A. S. (2009). First Lady Florence Harding: Behind the Tragedy and Controversy. Lawrence, KS: University Press of Kansas.

For information about Florence Harding, see the Bibliography of Warren G. Harding

=== Grace Coolidge ===
Grace Anna Coolidge, née Goodhue; January 3, 1879 – July 8, 1957; She was the wife of Calvin Coolidge.

Books

- Ferrell, R. H. (2008). Grace Coolidge: The people's lady in Silent Cal's White House. Lawrence, KS: University Press of Kansas.

For information about Grace Coolidge, see the Bibliography of Calvin Coolidge.

=== Lou Henry Hoover ===
Lou Henry Hoover, née Henry; March 29, 1874 – January 7, 1944; She was the wife of Herbert Hoover.

Books

- Allen, A. B. (2000). An Independent Woman: The Life of Lou Henry Hoover. Westport, CT. Greenwood Press
- Mayer, D. C. (1994). Lou Henry Hoover: Essays on a Busy Life. Worland, WY: High Plains Publishing.
- Walch, T. (2003). Uncommon Americans: The Lives and Legacies of Herbert and Lou Henry Hoover. Westport, CT: Praeger.
- Young, N. B. (2016). Lou Henry Hoover: Activist First Lady. Lawrence, KS: University Press of Kansas.

Journal articles

- Clements, K. (2004). The New Era and the New Woman. Pacific Historical Review, 73(3), pp. 425–462.
- Day, D. (1990). A New Perspective on the "DePriest Tea" Historiographic Controversy. The Journal of Negro History, 75(3/4), pp. 120–124.
- Jones, M. (2014). The Joy of Sympathetic Companionship: The Correspondence of Mary Vaux Walcott and Lou Henry Hoover. Quaker History, 103(1), pp. 36–52.
- Mayer, D. (1990). An Uncommon Woman: The Quiet Leadership Style of Lou Henry Hoover. Presidential Studies Quarterly, 20(4), pp. 685–698.
- Melville, J. (1988). The First Lady and the Cowgirl. Pacific Historical Review, 57(1), pp. 73–76.

Primary sources

- Lou Henry Hoover Papers. The Herbert Hoover Library.

=== Eleanor Roosevelt ===
Anna Eleanor Roosevelt, née Roosevelt; (born October 11, 1884 – died November 7, 1962); (in position March 4, 1933 – April 12, 1945); She was the wife of Franklin Roosevelt. Because her husband was the longest serving President, Eleanor Roosevelt is the longest serving First Lady.

- See Bibliography of Eleanor Roosevelt for works about and by Eleanor Roosevelt.

=== Bess Truman ===
Elizabeth Virginia Truman, née Wallace; (born February 13, 1885 – died October 18, 1982); (in position April 12, 1945 – January 20, 1953 ); She was the wife of Harry S. Truman.

Books

- Sale, S. L. (2010). Bess Wallace Truman: Harry's White House "boss". Lawrence, KS: University Press of Kansas.
- Truman, M. (2014). Bess Truman. Newbury CT: New Word City.

Primary sources

- Truman, H. S., & Ferrell, R. H. (1997). Off the Record: The Private Papers of Harry S. Truman. Columbia: University of Missouri Press.
- Truman, H. S., Truman, B. W., & Ferrell, R. H. (1998). Dear Bess: The Letters from Harry to Bess Truman, 1910-1959. Columbia: University of Missouri Press.
- The papers of Harry S. Truman. The Truman Library.

Biographies of with significant information about

- Levantrosser, W. F. (1986). Harry S. Truman: The Man from Independence. New York: Greenwood Press.
- McCullough, D. (1992). Truman. New York: Simon & Schuster.
- Truman, H. S., & Ferrell, R. H. (2002). The Autobiography of Harry S. Truman. Columbia: University of Missouri Press.

=== Mamie Eisenhower ===
Mamie Geneva Eisenhower, née Doud; (born November 14, 1896 – died November 1, 1979); (in position January 20, 1953 – January 20, 1961); She was the wife of Dwight Eisenhower. She was the last First Lady to be born in the nineteenth century.

Books

- Eisenhower, S. (1997). Mrs. Ike: Memories and reflections on the life of Mamie Eisenhower. Albany, NY: Ferrous Books.
- Holt, M. I. (2007). Mamie Doud Eisenhower: The General's First Lady. Lawrence, KS: University Press of Kansas.

Primary sources

- The papers of Dwight David Eisenhower. The United States National Archives.
- Eisenhower, D. D., Chandler, A. D., Galambos, L., Van, E. D. (2003). The Papers of Dwight David Eisenhower. Baltimore: Johns Hopkins University Press.

Biographies of with significant information about

- Ambrose, S. E. (1983). Eisenhower. New York: Simon and Schuster.

=== Jacqueline Kennedy Onassis ===
Jacqueline Lee Kennedy Onassis, née Bouvier; (born July 28, 1929 – died May 19, 1994); (In position January 20, 1961 – November 22, 1963); She was the wife of John F. Kennedy.

Books

- Adler, B. (2014). The Eloquent Jacqueline Kennedy Onassis: A portrait in her own words. New York: HarperCollins.
- Alam, M. B. (2007). Jackie Kennedy: Trailblazer. New York: Nova History Publications.
- Leaming, B. (2015). Jacqueline Bouvier Kennedy Onassis: The Untold Story. New York: Thomas Dunne Books.
- Perry, B. A. (2019). Jacqueline Kennedy: First Lady of the New Frontier. Lawrence, KS: University Press of Kansas.
- Pottker, J. (2002). Janet and Jackie: The Story of a Mother and Her Daughter. New York: St. Martin's Press.
- Spoto, D. (2000). Jacqueline Bouvier Kennedy Onassis: A Life. New York: St. Martin's Press.

Journal articles

- Walton, W. (2013). Jacqueline Kennedy, Frenchness, and French-American Relations in the 1950s and Early 1960s. French Politics, Culture & Society, 31(2), pp. 34–57.

Primary sources

- Ritchie, D., & Schlesinger, A. (2012). Jacqueline Kennedy: Historical Conversations On Her Life With John F. Kennedy The Oral History Review, 39(1), pp. 162–165.

Biographies of with significant information about

- O'Brien, M. (2006). John F. Kennedy: A Biography. New York: St. Martin's Press.

=== Lady Bird Johnson ===
Claudia Alta "Lady Bird" Johnson, née Taylor; (born December 22, 1912 – died July 11, 2007); (in position November 22, 1963 – January 20, 1969); She was the wife of Lyndon B. Johnson.

Books

- Gillette, M. L. (2015). Lady Bird Johnson: An oral history. New York: Oxford University Press.
- Gould, L. L. (1999). Lady Bird Johnson: Our Environmental First Lady. Lawrence, KS: University Press of Kansas.
- Johnson, C. A. (2012). Lady Bird Johnson. New York: Oxford University Press.
- Russell, J. J. (2014). Lady Bird: A Biography of Mrs. Johnson. New York: Simon and Schuster.

Journal articles

- Gould, L. (1986). First Lady as Catalyst: Lady Bird Johnson and Highway Beautification in the 1960s. Environmental Review, 10(2), pp. 77–92.
- Koman, R. (2001). "...To Leave This Splendor for Our Grandchildren": Lady Bird Johnson, Environmentalist Extraordinaire. OAH Magazine of History, 15(3), pp. 30–34.
- Smith, N. (1990). Private Reflections on a Public Life: The Papers on Lady Bird Johnson at the LBJ Library. Presidential Studies Quarterly, 20(4), pp. 737–744.

Biographies of Lyndon Johnson with significant information about Lady Bird Johnson

- Caro, R. A. (1982/1990/2002/2012) The Years of Lyndon Johnson (4 vols.). New York: Knopf.
- Dallek, Robert (2005). Lyndon B. Johnson: Portrait of a President. New York: Oxford University Press.

=== Pat Nixon ===
Thelma Catherine "Pat" Nixon, née Ryan; (born March 16, 1912 – died June 22, 1993); (in position January 20, 1969 – August 9, 1974); She was the wife of Richard Nixon.

Books

- Brennan, M. C. (2011). Pat Nixon: Embattled First Lady. Lawrence, KS: University Press of Kansas.
- Eisenhower, J. N. (1986). Pat Nixon: The Untold Story. New York: Simon & Schuster.
- David, L. (1978). The Lonely Lady of San Clemente: The Story of Pat Nixon. New York: Berkley Publishing.
- Swift, W. (2014). Pat and Dick: The Nixons, An Intimate Portrait of a Marriage. New York: Simon & Schuster.

Biographies of Richard Nixon with significant information about Pat Nixon

- Farrell, J. A. (2017). Richard Nixon: The Life. New York: Doubleday.
- Thomas, E. (2016). Being Nixon: A Man Divided. New York: Random House.

=== Betty Ford ===
Elizabeth Anne Ford, née Bloomer, formerly Warren; (born April 8, 1918 – died July 8, 2011); (in position August 9, 1974 – January 20, 1977); She was the wife of Gerald R. Ford.

Books

- McCubbin, L. (2019). Betty Ford: First Lady, Women's Advocate, Survivor, Trailblazer. New York :Gallery Books.
- Greene, J. R. (2019). Betty Ford: Candor and Courage in the White House. Lawrence, KS: University Press of Kansas.

Journal articles

- Borrelli, M. (2001). Competing Conceptions of the First Ladyship: Public Responses to Betty Ford's "60 Minutes" Interview. Presidential Studies Quarterly, 31(3), pp. 397–414.
- Tobin, L. (1990). Betty Ford as First Lady: A Woman for Women. Presidential Studies Quarterly, 20(4), pp. 761–767.

Biographies of Gerald Ford with significant information about Betty Ford

- Cannon, J., & Cannon, S. (2014). Gerald R. Ford: An Honorable Life. Ann Arbor: University of Michigan Press.

=== Rosalynn Carter ===
Eleanor Rosalynn Carter, née Smith; (born August 18, 1927 – died November 19, 2023); (in position January 20, 1977 – January 20, 1981); She was the wife of Jimmy Carter.

Books

- Godbold, E. S. (2010). Jimmy and Rosalynn Carter: The Georgia Years, 1924-1974. New York: Oxford University Press.
- Kaufman, S. (2007). Rosalynn Carter: Equal Partner in the White House. Lawrence, KS: University Press of Kansas.

Journal articles

- The American Bar Association. Human Rights Heroes: Jimmy and Rosalynn Carter. (2003). Human Rights, 30(1), pp. 24–24.
- Jensen, F. (1990). An Awesome Responsibility: Rosalynn Carter as First Lady. Presidential Studies Quarterly, 20(4), pp. 769–775.
- Smith, K. (1997). The First Lady Represents America: Rosalynn Carter in South America. Presidential Studies Quarterly, 27(3), pp. 540–548.

Primary sources

- Carter, J. (2015). A Full Life: Reflections at Ninety. New York: Simon & Schuster.
- Carter, R. (1994). First Lady from Plains. Fayetteville: University of Arkansas Press.

Biographies of Jimmy Carter with significant information about Rosalynn Carter

- Balmer, R. (2014). Redeemer: The Life of Jimmy Carter. New York: Basic Books.
- Eizenstat, S., & Albright, M. K. (2020). President Carter: The White House Years. New York: St. Martin's Press.

=== Nancy Reagan ===
Nancy Davis Reagan, née Robbins, later Davis (adoption); (born July 6, 1921 – died March 6, 2016); (in position January 20, 1981 – January 20, 1989); She was the wife of Ronald Reagan.

Books

- Benze, James G. (2005). Nancy Reagan: On the White House Stage. Lawrence, KS: University Press of Kansas.
- Deaver, M. K. (2004). Nancy: A Portrait of My Years with Nancy Reagan. New York: William Morrow.
- Leamer, L. (1983). Make-Believe: The Story of Nancy and Ronald Reagan. New York: HarperCollins.
- Loizeau, P. M. (2004). Nancy Reagan: The Woman Behind the Man. Hauppauge, NY: Nova Publishers.
- Loizeau, P. M. (2005). Nancy Reagan in Perspective. Hauppauge, NY: Nova Publishers.
- Schifando, P., & Joseph, J. (2007). Entertaining at the White House with Nancy Reagan. New York: William Morrow.
- Wertheimer, M. M. (2004). Nancy Reagan in Perspective. Lanham, MD: Rowman & Littlefield Publishers.

Journal articles

- Benez, J. (1990). Nancy Reagan: China Doll or Dragon Lady? Presidential Studies Quarterly, 20(4), pp. 777–790.
- Stimpson, C. (1988). Nancy Reagan Wears a Hat: Feminism and Its Cultural Consensus. Critical Inquiry, 14(2), pp. 223–243.

Primary sources

- Reagan, N., & Libby, B. (1980). Nancy: The Autobiography of America's First Lady. New York: HarperCollins.
- Reagan, N., & Novak, W. (1989). My Turn: The Memoirs of Nancy Reagan. New York: Random House.
- Reagan, N., & Reagan, R. (2002). I Love You, Ronnie: The Letters of Ronald Reagan to Nancy Reagan. New York: Random House.

Biographies of Ronald Reagan with significant information about Nancy Reagan

- Cannon, Lou (2003). Governor Reagan: His Rise to Power. New York: Public Affairs.
- Cannon, L. (2008). President Reagan: The Role of a Lifetime. New York: PublicAffairs.

=== Barbara Bush ===
Barbara Pierce Bush, née Pierce; (born June 8, 1925 – died April 17, 2018); (in position January 20, 1989 – January 20, 1993); She was the wife of George H. W. Bush. She is one of two individuals to be both a wife and mother of a president.

Books

- Gullan, H. I. (2001). Faith of our Mothers: The Stories of Presidential Mothers from Mary Washington to Barbara Bush. Grand Rapids: William B. Eerdmans.
- Kelley, K. (2005). The Family: The Real Story of the Bush Dynasty. New York: Anchor Books.
- Killian, P. (2003). Barbara Bush: Matriarch of a Dynasty. New York: St. Martin's Press.
- Myra, G. G. (2018). Barbara Bush: Presidential Matriarch. Lawrence, KS: University Press of Kansas.
- Page, S. (2019). The Matriarch: Barbara Bush and the Making of an American Dynasty. New York: Twelve.
- Radcliffe, D. (1990). Simply Barbara Bush: A Portrait of America's Candid First Lady. New York: Warner Books.

Journal articles

- Hertz, R., & Reverby, S. (1995). Gentility, Gender, and Political Protest: The Barbara Bush Controversy at Wellesley College. Gender and Society, 9(5), pp. 594–611.

Primary sources

- Bush, B. (1994). Barbara Bush: A Memoir. New York: Scribner.
- Bush, B. (2004). Reflections: Life After the White House. New York: Scribner.

Biographies of George H. W. Bush with significant information about Barbara Bush

=== Hillary Clinton ===
Hillary Diane Rodham Clinton, née Rodham; October 26, 1947; She is married to Bill Clinton. After her time as first lady, she became a United States senator and later secretary of state. She is the only first lady to have held national office. She became the first woman to run for president on a major party ticket and the first first lady to run for president in 2016.

- See Bibliography of Hillary Clinton

=== Laura Bush ===
Laura Lane Welch Bush, née Welch; (born November 4, 1946); (in position January 20, 2001 – January 20, 2009); She is married to George W. Bush.

Books

- Gerhart, A. (2014). The Perfect Wife: The life and choices of Laura Bush. New York: Simon & Schuster.
- Kelley, K. (2005). The Family: The Real Story of the Bush Dynasty. New York: Anchor Books.
- Kessler, R. (2006). Laura Bush: An Intimate Portrait of the First Lady. New York: Doubleday.

Journal articles

- Burns, L. (2005). Collective Memory and the Candidates' Wives in the 2004 Presidential Campaign. Rhetoric and Public Affairs, 8(4), pp. 684–688.
- Kniffel, L. (2001). First Lady, First Librarian. American Libraries, 32(2), pp. 50–51.
- Kniffel, L. (2008). 8 Years Later: Laura Bush: Librarian in the White House. American Libraries, 39(11), 42-47.
- MacManus, S., & Quecan, A. (2008). Spouses as Campaign Surrogates: Strategic Appearances by Presidential and Vice Presidential Candidates' Wives in the 2004 Election. Political Science and Politics, 41(2), pp. 337–348.
- Muller, P. (2002). Leveraging Laura Bush. American Libraries, 33(3), pp. 38–38.
- Nixie, K., & Gilles, M. (2009). Mixed Reviews on Laura Bush. American Libraries, 40(1/2), pp. 10–10.
- Sulfaro, V. (2007). Affective Evaluations of First Ladies: A Comparison of Hillary Clinton and Laura Bush. Presidential Studies Quarterly, 37(3), pp. 486–514.

Primary sources

- Bush, L. (2014). Spoken from the Heart. New York: Scribner.

Biographies of with significant information about

- Smith, J. E. (2017). Bush. New York: Simon & Schuster.

=== Michelle Obama ===
Michelle LaVaughn Robinson Obama, née Robinson; January 17, 1964; She is married to Barack Obama. She is the first and only African American First Lady.

Books

Journal articles

Primary sources

- Obama, M. (2018). Becoming. New York: Crown.

Biographies of with significant information about Michelle LaVaughn Robinson Obama

=== Melania Trump ===
Melania Trump, née Knavs, born Melanija Knavs; April 26, 1970; She is married to Donald Trump. She is the second first lady, after Louisa Adams, born outside the United States.

Books

Journal articles

Primary sources

Biographies of with significant information about Melania Trump

=== Jill Biden ===
Jill Tracy Jacobs Biden, née Jacobs, born June 3, 1951; She is the second wife of Joe Biden; his first wife, Neilia Hunter Biden died in 1972 prior to his becoming President of the United States.

Books

Journal articles

Primary sources

Biographies of with significant information about Jill Biden

== See also ==
- First Ladies National Historic Site
- First Lady of the United States
- List of first ladies of the United States
