= Bibliography of John Tyler =

John Tyler
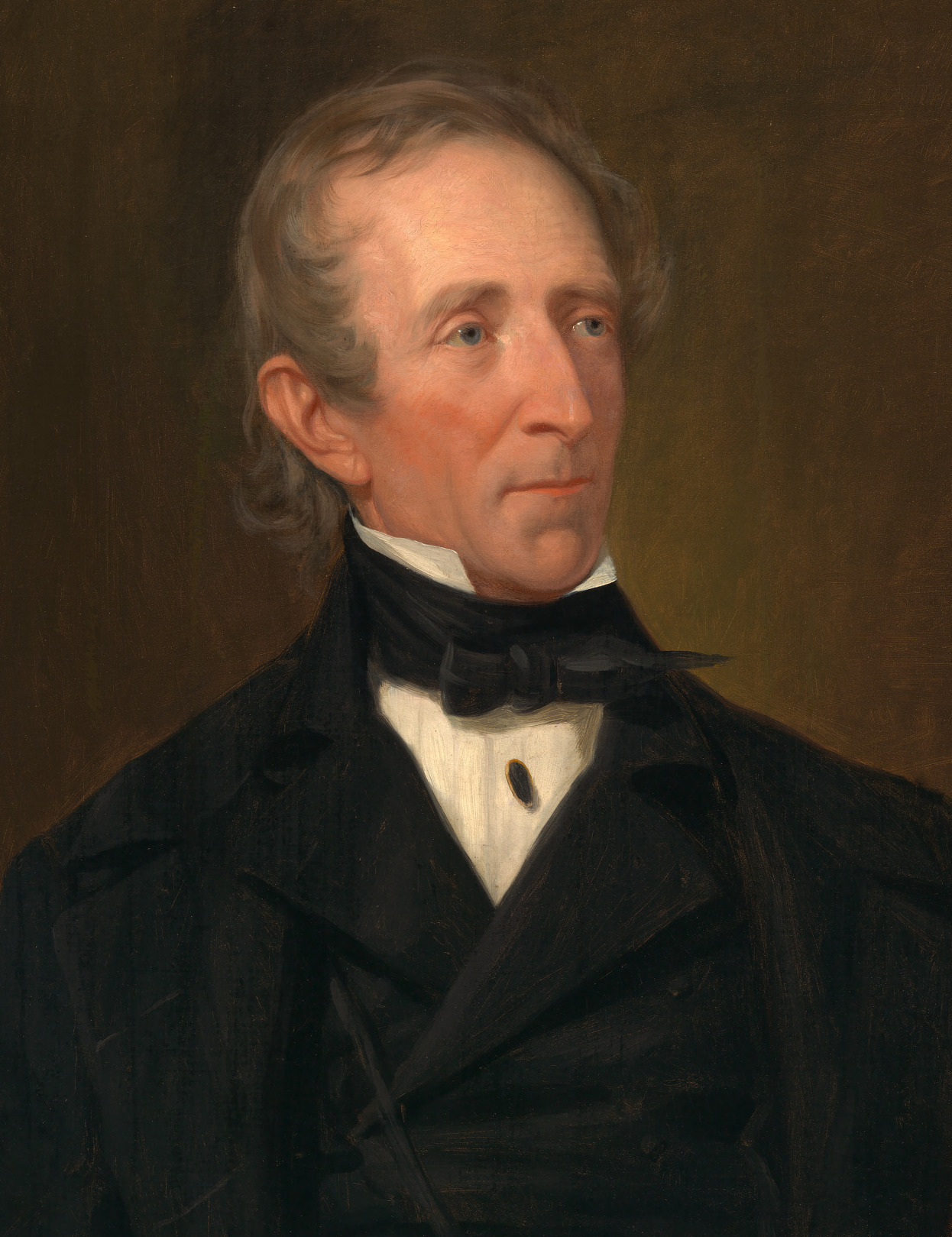
- Portrait, 1842

10th President of the United States
- In office April 4, 1841 – March 4, 1845
- Vice President: Vacant (Note: Tyler was vice president under President William Henry Harrison and became president upon Harrison's death on April 4, 1841. This was before the adoption of the Twenty-fifth Amendment in 1967, and a vacancy in the office of vice president was not filled until the next ensuing election and inauguration.)
- Preceded by: William Henry Harrison
- Succeeded by: James K. Polk

10th Vice President of the United States
- In office March 4, 1841 – April 4, 1841
- President: William Henry Harrison
- Preceded by: Richard Mentor Johnson
- Succeeded by: George M. Dallas

United States Senator from Virginia
- In office March 4, 1827 – February 29, 1836
- Preceded by: John Randolph
- Succeeded by: William Cabell Rives

President pro tempore of the United States Senate
- In office March 3, 1835 – December 6, 1835
- Preceded by: George Poindexter
- Succeeded by: William R. King

23rd Governor of Virginia
- In office December 10, 1825 – March 4, 1827
- Preceded by: James Pleasants
- Succeeded by: William Branch Giles

Member of the U.S. House of Representatives from Virginia's 23rd district
- In office December 17, 1816 – March 3, 1821
- Preceded by: John Clopton
- Succeeded by: Andrew Stevenson

Delegate from Virginia to the Provisional Congress of the Confederate States
- In office February 4, 1861 – January 17, 1862
- Preceded by: Constituency established
- Succeeded by: Constituency abolished

Personal details
- Born: March 29, 1790 Greenway Plantation, Charles City County, Virginia, U.S.
- Died: January 18, 1862 (aged 71) Ballard House, Richmond, Virginia
- Party: Whig (1834–1841)
- Other political affiliations: Democratic-Republican (1811–1828); Democratic (1828–1834); Tyler Party (1844); Independent (1841–1844, 1844–1862)
- Spouses: Letitia Christian (m. 1813; died 1842) Julia Gardiner (m. 1844)
- Children: 15, including Robert, John Jr., Letitia, David, John Alexander and Lyon
- Parents: John Tyler Sr.; Mary Armistead
- Education: College of William & Mary

Military service
- Allegiance: United States
- Branch/service: Virginia militia
- Years of service: 1813
- Rank: Captain
- Unit: Charles City Rifles
- Battles/wars: War of 1812

This is a bibliography of works about John Tyler, a governor of Virginia, and the tenth president of the United States.

John Tyler (March 29, 1790 – January 18, 1862) was the tenth president of the United States, serving from 1841 to 1845, after briefly holding office as the tenth vice president in 1841. He was elected vice president on the 1840 Whig ticket with William Henry Harrison and succeeded to the presidency following Harrison's death 31 days after taking office. Tyler was a staunch supporter of states' rights, including with regard to slavery, and adopted nationalist policies as president only when they did not infringe on state powers. His unexpected rise to the presidency threatened the presidential ambitions of Senator Henry Clay and other Whig politicians and left Tyler estranged from both major political parties of the time: the Whigs and the Democrats. When the American Civil War began in 1861, Tyler sided with the Confederacy. He presided over the opening of the Virginia Secession Convention and served as a member of the Provisional Congress of the Confederate States. Tyler was subsequently elected to the Confederate House of Representatives but died before it convened.

Works listed here are cited in the notes or bibliographies of scholarly sources. Each is published by an academic or major press, written by a recognized expert, or substantially reviewed in scholarly journals; borderline cases are omitted. A selection of primary sources are included. Many of the books below carry their own bibliographies; see the Further reading section for other bibliographies, and the External links section for historical sites, academic sites, and museums.

Citations follow APA style. (Note: Entries are in plain text APA 7 format without templates; templates are used only for reviews and notes.) Book have citations to academic journal or mainstream published reviews when available. For books only partly about the subject, relevant chapter or section titles are provided when useful and available. Translators of the original-language edition are included when possible. In cases where a title or name has appeared with more than one English spelling, the most recent published form is used and a footnote documents any earlier title under which the work appeared.

== General works about Tyler ==
- Chitwood, O. P. (1939). John Tyler, champion of the Old South. D. Appleton-Century Company.
- Crapol, E. P. (2006). John Tyler, the accidental president. University of North Carolina Press.
- Leahy, C. J. (2020). President without a party: The life of John Tyler. Louisiana State University Press.
- May, G. (2008). John Tyler. Times Books.
- Monroe, R. D. (2003). The republican vision of John Tyler. Texas A&M University Press.
- Morgan, R. J. (1954). A Whig embattled: The presidency under John Tyler. University of Nebraska Press.
- Peterson, N. L. (1989). The presidencies of William Henry Harrison and John Tyler. University Press of Kansas.
- Seager, R., II. (1963). And Tyler too: A biography of John and Julia Gardiner Tyler. McGraw-Hill.

=== Journal articles ===
- Callahan, D. P. (2021). The constitutional crisis that wasn't: The politics of John Tyler's presidential succession. The Virginia Magazine of History and Biography, 129(2), 122–155. JSTOR 27014474
- Cash, J. T. (2018). The isolated presidency: John Tyler and unilateral presidential power. American Political Thought, 7(1), 26–56. doi:10.1086/695644
- Crapol, E. P. (1997). John Tyler and the pursuit of national destiny. Journal of the Early Republic, 17(3), 467–491. JSTOR 3123944
- Dinnerstein, L. (1962). The accession of John Tyler to the presidency. The Virginia Magazine of History and Biography, 70(4), 447–458. JSTOR 4246893
- Gotlieb, H., & Grimes, G. (1959). President Tyler and the Gardiners: A new portrait. The Yale University Library Gazette, 34(1), 3–12. JSTOR 40859411
- Leahy, C. J. (2006). Torn between family and politics: John Tyler's struggle for balance. The Virginia Magazine of History and Biography, 114(3), 322–355.
- Leahy, C. J. (2012). Playing her greatest role: Priscilla Cooper Tyler and the politics of the White House social scene, 1841–44. The Virginia Magazine of History and Biography, 120(3), 236–269. JSTOR 41636706
- Maness, L. E., & Chesteen, R. D. (1980). The first attempt at presidential impeachment: Partisan politics and intra-party conflict at loose. Presidential Studies Quarterly, 10(1), 51–62. JSTOR 27547533
- Pugh, E. L. (1980). Women and slavery: Julia Gardiner Tyler and the Duchess of Sutherland. The Virginia Magazine of History and Biography, 88(2), 186–202. JSTOR 4248387
- Rathbun, L. (2001). The debate over annexing Texas and the emergence of Manifest Destiny. Rhetoric & Public Affairs, 4(3), 459–493. JSTOR 41940591
- Tyler, L. G. (1916). President John Tyler and the Ashburton Treaty. The William and Mary College Quarterly Historical Magazine, 25(1), 1–8. JSTOR 1915096

== Background and context ==
The below items contain significant information about John Tyler or significant background and context for his life and presidency.

- Feller, D. (1995). The Jacksonian promise: America, 1815–1840. Johns Hopkins University Press.
- Holt, M. F. (1999). The rise and fall of the American Whig Party: Jacksonian politics and the onset of the Civil War. Oxford University Press.
- Howe, D. W. (2007). What hath God wrought: The transformation of America, 1815–1848. Oxford University Press.
- McCormick, R. P. (1966). The second American party system: Party formation in the Jacksonian era. University of North Carolina Press.
- Pessen, E. (1969). Jacksonian America: Society, personality, and politics. Dorsey Press.
- Remini, R. V. (1988). The Jacksonian era. Harlan Davidson.
- Schlesinger, A. M., Jr. (1945). The age of Jackson. Little, Brown and Company.
- Sellers, C. (1991). The market revolution: Jacksonian America, 1815–1846. Oxford University Press.
- Van Deusen, G. G. (1959). The Jacksonian era, 1828–1848. Harper.
- Wilentz, S. (2005). The rise of American democracy: Jefferson to Lincoln. W. W. Norton & Company.

=== William Henry Harrison ===
- Booraem, H., V. (2012). A child of the revolution: William Henry Harrison and his world, 1773–1798. Kent State University Press.
- Burr, S. J. (1840). The life and times of William Henry Harrison. L. W. Ransom.
- Cleaves, F. (1939). Old Tippecanoe: William Henry Harrison and his time. Charles Scribner's Sons.
- Collins, G. (2012). William Henry Harrison. Times Books.
- Ellis, R. J. (2020). Old Tip vs. the Sly Fox: The 1840 election and the making of a partisan nation. University Press of Kansas.
- Gunderson, R. G. (1957). The log-cabin campaign. University of Kentucky Press.
- Hurt, R. D. (1998). The Ohio frontier: Crucible of the Old Northwest, 1720–1830. Indiana University Press.
- Jortner, A. (2012). The gods of Prophetstown: The Battle of Tippecanoe and the holy war for the American frontier. Oxford University Press.
- Owens, R. M. (2007). Mr. Jefferson's hammer: William Henry Harrison and the origins of American Indian policy. University of Oklahoma Press.
- Skaggs, D. C. (2014). William Henry Harrison and the conquest of the Ohio Country: Frontier fighting in the War of 1812. Johns Hopkins University Press.

== Primary sources ==
Collected papers and speeches

- The John Tyler Papers (digitized collection) at the Library of Congress (Note: More than 1,400 items dating from 1691 to 1918, chiefly correspondence to and from Tyler, together with papers of Julia Gardiner Tyler and the Gardiner family. Much of Tyler's correspondence was lost during the American Civil War; the surviving material was recovered by his son Lyon Gardiner Tyler and sold to the Library of Congress in 1919.)
- Tyler Family Papers, Group A, 1716–1944 at the Special Collections Research Center, William & Mary (Note: Eleven linear feet (22 boxes), including Tyler's correspondence from 1818 to 1862 and the papers of Letitia Christian Tyler, Julia Gardiner Tyler and their children.)
- The American Presidency Project – John Tyler (online collection) at the University of California, Santa Barbara
- Richardson, J. D. (Ed.). (1908). A compilation of the messages and papers of the presidents, 1789–1907 (Vol. 4). Bureau of National Literature and Art. (Note: Tyler's messages, veto messages and proclamations for April 4, 1841 – March 4, 1845 make up the second part of volume 4; that portion is separately available as a Project Gutenberg e-text.)
- Tyler, L. G. (1884–1896). The letters and times of the Tylers (Vols. 1–3). (Note: Volumes 1 and 2 were published by Whittet & Shepperson at Richmond, Virginia, in 1884; volume 3, issued as a supplement, appeared at Williamsburg, Virginia, in 1896. Compiled by Tyler's son from family papers, the work prints the texts of many letters that no longer survive in manuscript.)

Individual papers and speeches

- April 9, 1841: Address Upon Assuming the Office of President of the United States.
- June 1, 1841: Special Session Message.
- August 16, 1841: Veto Message (bill to incorporate the subscribers to the Fiscal Bank of the United States).
- September 9, 1841: Veto Message (bill to establish the Fiscal Corporation of the United States).
- December 7, 1841: First Annual Message.
- August 9, 1842: Veto Message (bill to provide revenue from imports and to change the tariff laws).
- August 11, 1842: Message to Senate on Negotiations with Britain (transmitting the Webster–Ashburton Treaty).
- August 30, 1842: Message to the House of Representatives (Tyler's protest against the report of the House select committee appointed to consider his veto of the tariff bill).
- December 6, 1842: Second Annual Message.
- December 30, 1842: Message to Congress Regarding US-Hawaiian Relations.
- December 5, 1843: Third Annual Message.
- April 22, 1844: Message to the Senate Transmitting a Treaty of Annexation Concluded Between the United States of America and the Republic of Texas.
- June 10, 1844: Message to the House of Representatives Transmitting the Rejected Treaty for the Annexation of the Republic of Texas to the United States.
- December 3, 1844: Fourth Annual Message.

Contemporary accounts

- Wise, H. A. (1872). Seven decades of the Union: The humanities and materialism, illustrated by a memoir of John Tyler, with reminiscences of some of his great cotemporaries. J. B. Lippincott. (Note: Henry A. Wise represented Virginia in the House of Representatives during Tyler's presidency and led the small band of Tyler loyalists there known as the "Corporal's Guard". Tyler appointed him minister to Brazil in February 1844, a post he held until 1847.)

== See also ==
- Bibliography of Martin Van Buren
- Bibliography of Andrew Jackson
- Second Party System
- Jacksonian democracy
