= Priscilla Cooper Tyler =

First Lady of the United States from 1842 to 1844

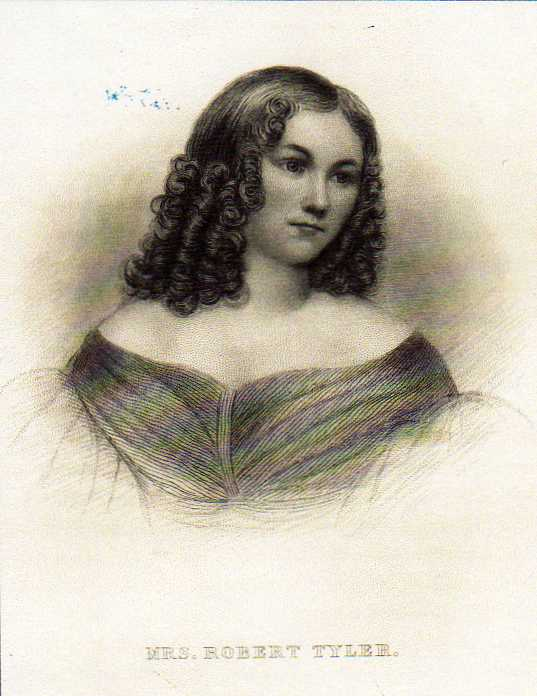

First Lady of the United States
- In role September 10, 1842 – June 26, 1844
- President: John Tyler
- Preceded by: Letitia Christian Tyler
- Succeeded by: Julia Gardiner Tyler

Personal details
- Born: Elizabeth Priscilla Cooper; June 14, 1816 New York City, New York, U.S.
- Died: December 29, 1889 (aged 73) Montgomery, Alabama, U.S.
- Spouse: Robert Tyler (m. 1839; died 1877)
- Children: 9

Elizabeth Priscilla Cooper Tyler (née Cooper; June 14, 1816 – December 29, 1889) was the official White House hostess and first lady of the United States from 1841 to 1844. She was a daughter-in-law of then-president John Tyler through her marriage to his son Robert Tyler. She assumed the first lady's responsibilities at the beginning of the Tyler administration, working in the stead of her mother-in-law, first lady Letitia Christian Tyler, who was too ill to do so herself. After Letitia Tyler's death in September 1842, Priscilla Tyler was effectively the first lady, overseeing social affairs in the White House.

Tyler was previously an unsuccessful actress. Her marriage inserted her into the political life of the Tyler family. Balancing the national spotlight with new motherhood, Tyler was widely celebrated as a hostess and recognized as a highlight of what was otherwise a controversial presidency. She managed several receptions, dinners, and other events each week, sometimes bringing her to the point of exhaustion. Tyler left the White House as the president prepared for remarriage, and she settled in Philadelphia. Siding with the Confederate States of America during the American Civil War, Tyler and her husband moved to the Southern United States. Tyler lived in relative obscurity in Montgomery, Alabama, until her death in 1889.

== Early life ==
Elizabeth Priscilla Cooper was born on June 14, 1816, in New York City, the third of her parents' nine children. Her father, Thomas Abthorpe Cooper, was a successful stage actor and producer. Her mother, Mary Fairlie Cooper, was a New York socialite. Her parents were of considerably different social classes, with the marriage causing outrage among her mother's family. Cooper's maternal grandfather, James Fairlie, was a veteran of the American Revolutionary War.

Cooper's mother died in 1833, and her father's handling of money created financial problems for the family, particularly due to his gambling. She began to work as an actress at the age of 17 when she appeared in Virginius alongside her father. It was not well-received. She acted alongside her father from 1835 to 1838, traveling the East Coast to perform in various plays. The Cooper family was well-off until the Panic of 1837, which plunged the family into poverty.

While playing Desdemona in a production of Othello in Richmond, Virginia, she met Robert Tyler, the eldest son of wealthy plantation owner and former US Senator John Tyler. One anecdote suggests that after she walked on stage, he was so taken by her that he remained standing after the rest of the audience had sat down. They began a courtship when he went backstage to meet her immediately after the play. In 19th century America, actresses had little social standing, and the addition of the Coopers' financial woes seemed to conspire to make any match between the two unlikely. Despite this, Tyler proposed to her six times over the course of their courtship before they were eventually wed.

== Marriage ==
Cooper married Tyler in Bristol, Virginia, on September 12, 1839. After their wedding, the couple moved to Williamsburg, Virginia, to live with Robert's family. John and Letitia Christian Tyler warmly welcomed her into the Tyler family. Priscilla Tyler grew close to her father-in-law. He even allowed her to open an account in every store in Williamsburg, but she stopped accepting such favors from the Tylers when she realized that they were poorer than they seemed. She was also close to her mother-in-law, Letitia Tyler, who had expressed great pleasure at the idea of their marriage. Despite this comradery, Tyler felt constrained living with her in-laws, worried that it was preventing her husband from establishing a career of his own. She attempted to help him with a burgeoning legal career by helping him prepare speeches and case material.

Priscilla's father was less pleased with the marriage, as he was loyal to the Democratic Party and vehemently opposed the Whig Party that John Tyler represented. John Tyler was the successful candidate for Vice President of the United States in the 1840 election. Priscilla Tyler hoped this would end the control that he exerted over Robert's career and would bring independence for her and her husband. After the sudden death of President William Henry Harrison one month into his term, John Tyler became President of the United States, and she accompanied the Tyler family to Washington, D.C.

== White House hostess ==
=== Adopting the role ===
By the time John Tyler assumed the presidency in 1841, his wife Letitia was not physically fit to serve as the White House hostess, so the responsibility was delegated to Priscilla Tyler. At only 25 years old, her youth was considered a benefit, and her experience in entertainment also served her in this capacity. She was delighted with the opportunity to host at the White House. On multiple occasions, she expressed shock at the fact that she was presiding over the White House and boasted to her friends about the role.

As a hostess, Tyler was highly regarded by most contemporaries, both in the United States and abroad. She worked with former first lady Dolley Madison and Secretary of State Daniel Webster to better prepare for her position. Tyler disliked the practice of returning social calls, but she did so on Madison's advice, doing what she described as "three days a week... three hours a day driving from one street to another in this city of magnificent distances". The challenges of Tyler's role were compounded by the fact that she was a new mother. Her first child had been born just months before she arrived at the White House, and she had her second child during her tenure.

As she was suddenly thrust into the role, she was forced to learn how to navigate Washington social life despite increasing political polarization. This polarization only added to the importance of Tyler's role, as her management of social affairs in the White House worked to counteract what was otherwise a period of severe hostility. The levity she created in the White House provided the president with political advantages, allowing him to better gauge and interact with prominent Washington figures across the political spectrum. Even the president's greatest critics spoke positively of the White House's social environment.

In September 1842, Letitia Tyler's health declined considerably, and it became apparent that she was dying. Priscilla Tyler was in New York at the time. Robert rushed to New York to return Priscilla to the White House, but they did not arrive until after Letitia's death. Tyler's status as a surrogate or "proxy" hostess reflected a common occurrence in the antebellum years, in which younger female family members stood in for the wives of presidents. Due to her more prominent role in the White House, Tyler's tenure as surrogate first lady in particular has become more prominent in historical analysis than that of Letitia Tyler.

=== Social events ===
Tyler hosted her first event a month into her father-in-law's administration. Her first duty as first lady was especially important, as it represented a return to normal after Harrison's death. Even more so, it was to set the tone for a new presidency that many challenged as illegitimate, as the constitution offered little guidance for presidential succession at the time. The pressure of organizing such an event, combined with the stress of caring for her first newborn and being pregnant with her second, caused her to faint as dessert was being served. After being caught and carried away by Secretary of State Daniel Webster, a man known for his promiscuity, her husband brought further attention to the scene by chasing after them and dumping a pitcher of water atop them. The incident was not repeated for the rest of her tenure, and all of her social events thereafter went uninterrupted.

Tyler ensured that social events were held regularly at the White House while she was responsible for hosting. She held small dinners two times per week while Congress was in session; one for visitors to the city, and one for government officials. She also held biweekly public receptions, as well as larger parties with approximately one thousand guests each month. Tyler became the first first lady to travel with a presidential party in June 1843, when she accompanied the president to Boston to dedicate the Bunker Hill Monument.

In March 1842, while seven months pregnant, Tyler was responsible for hosting a party in honor of Washington Irving and Charles Dickens, an occasion that brought about 3,000 people to the White House. One personal influence that Tyler had on Washington was the introduction of concerts by the United States Marine Band on the south lawn of the White House. In early 1843, Tyler was given charge of the White House while the president visited Virginia. During this time, Henri Gatien Bertrand requested a visit to the White House, and Tyler found herself hosting him with only an hour's warning. No one questioned her authority when she summoned the entire presidential cabinet to greet Bertrand and organized a dinner in his honor. Tyler then convinced him to return two days later so that she could organize a party in his honor. This was a gesture that deeply affected him.

== Later life and death ==
Robert and Priscilla Tyler left the White House for Philadelphia in March 1844, knowing that Julia Gardiner was set to marry the president and become the new White House hostess. President Tyler's daughter, Letitia Tyler-Semple, saw to White House social affairs until the wedding. After leaving the White House, the Tylers moved to Philadelphia where Robert Tyler began a legal career. Robert briefly returned to Washington to help his father in an ill-fated reelection attempt, which Priscilla considered an "interruption" in their lives. Together Robert and Priscilla Tyler had nine children, only six of whom would live to adulthood. Robert's advancing career allowed them a period of financial comfort, and they lived in Philadelphia until the onset of the American Civil War. When the Civil War broke out in 1861, the Tylers moved to Virginia, where Robert was register of the Confederate Treasury.

After the war, Robert became the editor of the Mail and Advertiser newspaper in Montgomery, Alabama. Tyler disliked Montgomery due to the high population of African Americans, and the Tylers became involved in Democratic politics to enforce white supremacy in Alabama. The family struggled financially for the rest of their lives. Tyler stayed in Montgomery after her husband's death in 1877, remaining there until her own death on December 29, 1889. The personal papers of the Tyler family, including those of Priscilla Cooper Tyler, are held by the Special Collections Research Center at the College of William and Mary.

== See also ==
- Bibliography of United States presidential spouses and first ladies
- Bibliography of John Tyler

Honorary titles
Preceded by Letitia Tyler	First Lady of the United States; Acting; 1842–1844	Succeeded by Julia Tyler
