= Letitia Christian Tyler =

First Lady of the United States from 1841 to 1842

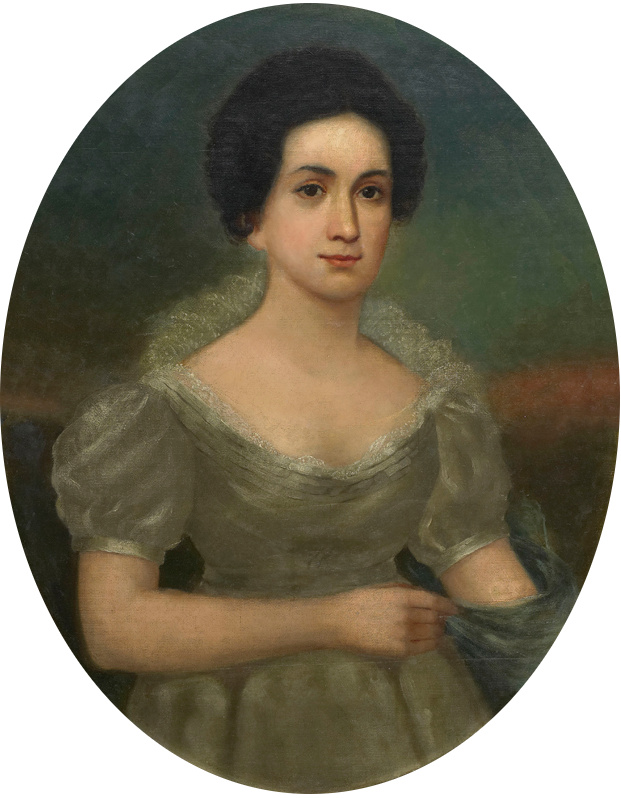
- Official portrait, 1842

First Lady of the United States
- In role April 4, 1841 – September 10, 1842
- President: John Tyler
- Preceded by: Anna Harrison; Jane Irwin Harrison (acting)
- Succeeded by: Priscilla Cooper Tyler (acting)

Second Lady of the United States
- In role March 4, 1841 – April 4, 1841
- Vice President: John Tyler
- Preceded by: Floride Calhoun
- Succeeded by: Sophia Dallas

First Lady of Virginia
- In role December 10, 1825 – March 4, 1827
- Governor: John Tyler
- Preceded by: Susanna Lawson Pleasants
- Succeeded by: Frances Ann Gwynn Giles

Personal details
- Born: Letitia Christian; November 12, 1790 Providence Forge, Virginia, U.S.
- Died: September 10, 1842 (aged 51) White House, Washington, D.C., U.S.
- Resting place: Cedar Grove Plantation Cemetery, New Kent County, Virginia
- Spouse: John Tyler (m. 1813)
- Children: 9, including Robert and Letitia

Letitia Christian Tyler (née Christian; November 12, 1790 – September 10, 1842) was the first lady of the United States from 1841 to 1842 as the first wife of President John Tyler. After meeting in 1808, the two married in 1813. Tyler managed their plantation in Virginia while her husband progressed his political career at the state capital and in Washington, D.C., accompanying him only while he was governor of Virginia. She had a stroke in 1839 that left her permanently disabled.

Tyler became the second lady of the United States when her husband became vice president of the United States in 1841, and she became the first lady when President William Henry Harrison died the following month and her husband ascended to the presidency. Tyler was unable to perform the duties of first lady due to her health, delegating them to her daughter-in-law Priscilla Cooper Tyler. She died of a second stroke in 1842, becoming the first person to die while serving as first lady of the United States. Tyler played virtually no role in her husband's presidency, but maintained a positive reputation among the American people.

== Early life ==
Letitia Christian was born on November 12, 1790, at the Cedar Grove plantation in New Kent County, Virginia. She was the seventh child of Mary (née Browne) and Robert Christian, a wealthy planter who was well connected with the nation's political elite, including President George Washington. She was raised as a devout Episcopalian, and she closely followed norms of the time relating to piety and chastity. Christian did not receive a formal education, but she was taught how to be the mistress of a Southern plantation.

The Christian and Tyler families were familiar with one another, and Christian met John Tyler while he was visiting in 1808. They began a courtship in which Tyler often stopped to visit her while traveling to the state capital. Their five-year courtship was restrained and it was three weeks before the wedding that Tyler first kissed her — on the hand. In his only surviving love letter to her, written a few months before their wedding, Tyler promised, "Whether I float or sink in the stream of fortune, you may be assured of this, that I shall never cease to love you." Christian's father opposed Tyler on political grounds, as Tyler was a supporter of Thomas Jefferson.

== Marriage and family ==
Letitia Christian and John Tyler married at Cedar Grove on March 29, 1813. After their marriage, they lived in their home Mons-Sacer, built on Tyler family land in Greenway Plantation using Christian family funds; Letitia's parents had died shortly after the wedding, leaving her a large inheritance. Letitia Tyler was left alone after the wedding, as her husband had been called up to serve in the War of 1812. Two years later, they sold Mons-Sacer and built the Woodburn house nearby before eventually purchasing Greenway in its entirety in 1821. The Tylers had nine children, seven of whom survived infancy: Mary in 1815, Robert in 1816, John III in 1819, Letitia in 1821, Elizabeth in 1823, Alice in 1827, and Tazewell in 1830. Their daughter Anne died in infancy in 1825, and a ninth unnamed child died at birth in 1832.

The Tylers struggled with money throughout their marriage, as the financial burdens of raising several children and participating in the social aspects of politics outpaced any inheritance they received. Tyler avoided the limelight during her husband's political rise, preferring domestic responsibilities to those of a public wife. Tyler was responsible for managing the plantation while her husband was away at the Virginia State Capitol, often with the assistance of relatives and hired managers. Her management of the plantation, and in particular her ability to oversee the economic aspects, allowed her husband to be away for long periods of time, so his political career could progress. Managing the plantation included managing their slaves, feeding them and weaving their clothes. There is no surviving record of how Tyler felt about slavery or her husband's ownership of slaves.

Tyler did accompany her husband while he served as the governor of Virginia. As the governor's wife, she worked as a hostess in the state's capital, Richmond. Despite her husband's insistence, she did not join him in Washington when he was elected to the United States Congress. She opted to stay in Virginia, as the plantation needed further management and she did not wish to live in the poor conditions provided by Washington, D.C. She accompanied her husband to Washington only once, in the winter of 1828–1829. Tyler generally deferred to her husband, but she made one significant exception when he suggested sending their eldest daughter to a Catholic school, which Tyler adamantly refused.

Tyler's health was poor throughout her life, and the Tylers' oldest child, Mary, was responsible for monitoring her when John was away. Tyler's health was worsened by the toll of several pregnancies and the burden of her husband often being away. By 1827, her poor health had become a constant, and she was plagued by regular headaches. Attempts were made to treat her illness with trips to the Greenbrier spring. Her husband stepped away from politics twice, in 1821 and in 1836, to be closer to her.

The Tylers moved to Williamsburg, Virginia, in 1837. In 1839, Tyler had a stroke that left her disabled, and her health deteriorated over the following years. Most of her time after her stroke was spent reading the Bible and her prayer book. By this point in her life, these were the only two books that she would read. She did, however, continue to oversee affairs at the plantation. After her son Robert married, Tyler developed a close bond with his wife Priscilla Cooper Tyler.

== First lady of the United States ==
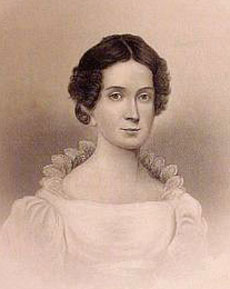
Letitia Tyler

The sudden death of President William Henry Harrison in 1841 caused John Tyler to ascend to the presidency. Letitia Tyler's health had made it impossible for her to manage the White House, and she did not immediately travel to Washington with the rest of her family. When she did arrive, she remained in a wheelchair in the upstairs living quarters of the White House. She came down once, to attend the wedding of her daughter Elizabeth in January 1842. She may have attended the theater at least once while serving as first lady. While upstairs, she continued to spend her time reading her Bible and her prayer book.

Although she retained authority over how the duties of the first lady were carried out, Tyler delegated the management of the White House to her daughter Letitia and her responsibilities as hostess to her daughter-in-law Priscilla. She also played the role of advisor for her husband as he often discussed difficult issues of the presidency with her. She was well-versed enough in political issues to discuss them in detail with visitors. Distinguished visitors to the White House, such as Charles Dickens and Washington Irving, were sometimes welcomed upstairs to meet her.

Tyler's physical and mental health deteriorated throughout 1842. She had a second stroke on September 9, 1842, and she died the following day on September 10. Her death came as a shock to the Tyler family, who believed that she had stabilized. She was the first woman to die while serving as first lady of the United States, and she remains the shortest-lived of any American first lady, dying at the age of 51. Her funeral was widely publicized as the first of an incumbent first lady. Her coffin lay in state in the East Room of the White House, then a procession carried her coffin away. Tyler was buried on her father's estate at Cedar Grove, and the White House was decorated in black for a period of mourning.

== Legacy ==
External videos
- America's First Ladies, Anna Harrison, Letitia Tyler & Julia Tyler, 2013, C-SPAN

Tyler had little influence on her husband's presidency, confined to the White House living quarters. She also played no public role, but she maintained a positive reputation despite her husband's embattled political situation. Priscilla Cooper Tyler remembered her as "the most entirely unselfish person you can imagine. Notwithstanding her very delicate health, mother attends to and regulates all the household affairs and all so quietly that you can't tell when she does it."

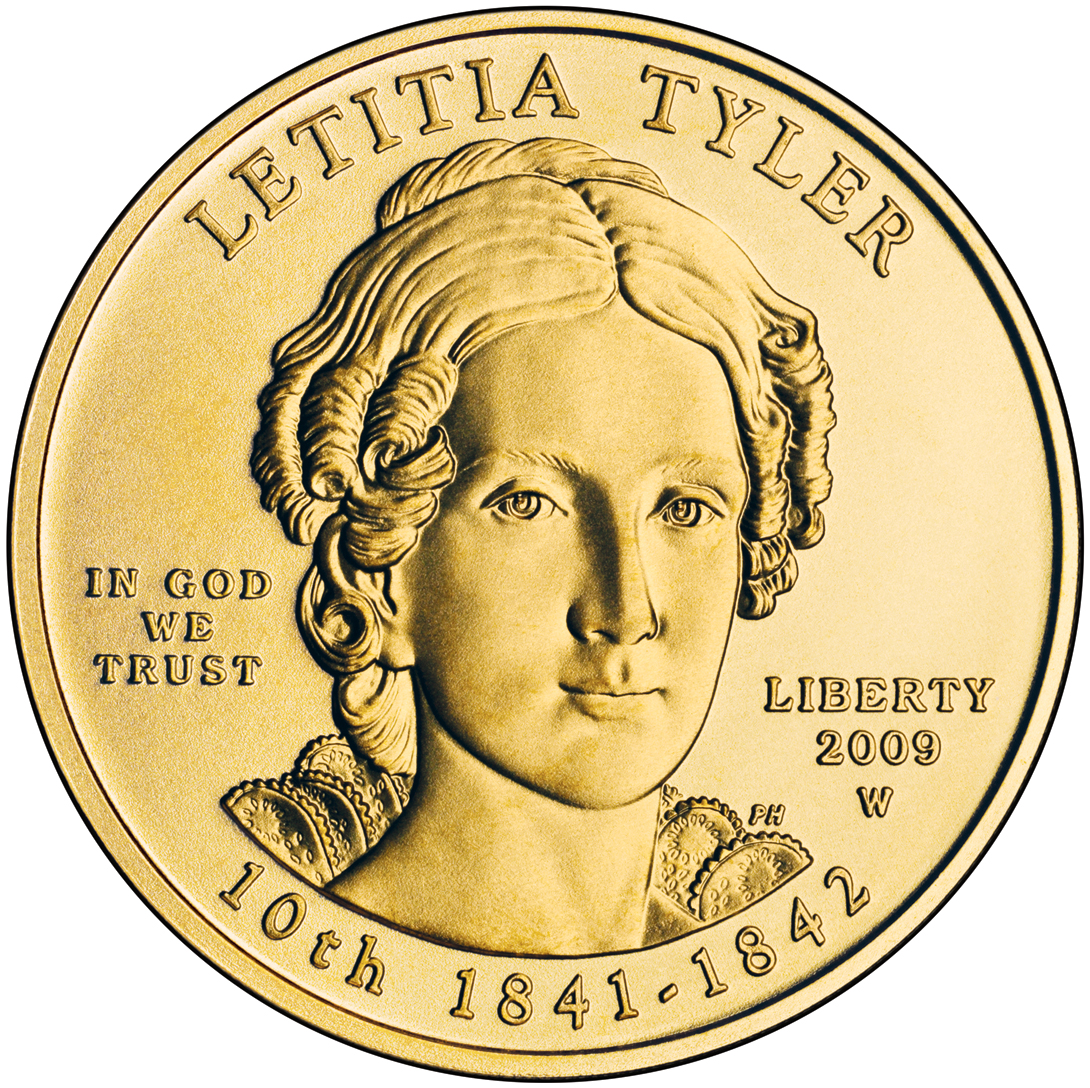
First Spouse Program gold coin for Letitia Tyler.

The first historian's appraisal of Tyler's tenure as first lady was that of Laura Carter Holloway in 1870. Few primary sources exist regarding Tyler's life, with most surviving mentions of her being those in letters between members of the Tyler family. None of Tyler's own letters survive. Due to her inability to serve as first lady, she has been overshadowed in historical analysis by her surrogate, Priscilla Cooper Tyler, and her husband's second wife, Julia Gardiner Tyler.

Tyler was a descendant of Manx settlers of Virginia and she appears on a 28p (£0.28) commemorative postage stamp from the Isle of Man Post Office, issued May 23, 2006, as part of a series honoring Manx-Americans. She also appears on a one-half-ounce gold coin and a bronze medal issued by the United States Mint on July 2, 2009, as part of a series of commemorative first spouse coins.

Since 1982, Siena College Research Institute has periodically conducted surveys asking historians to assess American first ladies according to a cumulative score on the independent criteria of their background, value to the country, intelligence, courage, accomplishments, integrity, leadership, being their own women, public image, and value to the president. Historians were found to know "almost nothing about" Tyler. Consistently, she has been ranked in the bottom quartile of first ladies by historians in these surveys. In terms of cumulative assessment, Tyler has been ranked:

- 35th of 42 in 1982
- 30th of 37 in 1993
- 34th of 38 in 2003
- 35th of 38 in 2008
- 37th of 39 in 2014
- 37th of 40 in 2020

In the 2014 survey, Tyler and her husband were ranked the 36th out of 39 first couples in terms of being a "power couple".

== See also ==
- Bibliography of United States presidential spouses and first ladies
- Bibliography of John Tyler

Honorary titles
Vacant Title last held by Floride Calhoun	Second Lady of the United States; 1841	Vacant Title next held by Sophia Dallas
Preceded by Anna Harrison; Jane Harrison (Acting)	First Lady of the United States; 1841–1842	Succeeded by Priscilla Tyler; Acting
