= Catherine Allgor =

Historian of early America

- Education: Mount Holyoke College; Yale University (PhD)
- Occupations: Historian, author
- Writing career
- Language: English
- Period: 18th–19th century
- Genres: non-fiction, history
- Subject: Early American history

Catherine Allgor is an American historian focusing on women and early American history; she has written and lectured extensively on Dolley Madison and the founding generation of American women. From 2017 until 2024, she served as the president of the Massachusetts Historical Society. Previously Allgor was appointed to the James Madison Memorial Fellowship Foundation by President Barack Obama and has served as the Nadine and Robert A. Skotheim Director of Education at the Huntington Library in San Marino, California. Formerly she was a Professor of History and UC Presidential Chair at the University of California, Riverside, and has taught at Claremont McKenna College, Harvard University, and Simmons University. Allgor was a Frances Perkins Scholar at Mount Holyoke College and received her PhD from Yale University where she was awarded the Yale Teaching Award. Her dissertation was awarded best dissertation in American history at Yale and received the Lerner-Scott Prize for the Best Dissertation in U.S. Women's History.

== Works ==
Books

- Allgor, C. (2000). Parlor Politics: In which the ladies of Washington help build a city and a government. University of Virginia Press. (Note: Parlor Politics was the winner of the James H. Broussard First Book Prize from the Society for Historians of the Early American Republic and the Lerner-Scott Dissertation Prize from the Organization of American Historians.) (Note: Academic journal reviews for Parlor Politics: In which the ladies of Washington help build a city and a government:)
- Allgor, C. (2006). A Perfect Union: Dolley Madison and the Creation of the American Nation. MacMillan/Henry Holt & Co. (Note: Academic journal reviews for A Perfect Union: Dolley Madison and the Creation of the American Nation:)
- Cutts, M. E. E., & Allgor, C. (2012). The Queen of America: Mary Cutts’s life of Dolley Madison. University of Virginia Press.
- Allgor, C. (2013). Dolley Madison: The Problem of National Unity. Routledge. (Note: Academic journal reviews for Dolley Madison: The Problem of National Unity:)
- Allgor, C., & M. M. Heffrom. (2013). A Monarch in a Republic. In D. Waldstreicher (Ed.), A Companion to John Adams and John Quincy Adams. John Wiley and Sons.
- Allgor, C. (2016). Dolley Madison: A Case Study in Southern Style. In C. A. Kierner & S. G. Treadway (Eds.), Virginia Women: Their Lives and Times (Vol. 1). University of Georgia Press.
- Allgor, C. (2018). "Remember... I'm Your Man": Masculinity, Marriage, and Gender in Hamilton. In R. C. Romano, & C. B. Potter (Eds.), Historians on Hamilton: How a Blockbuster Musical Is Restaging America’s Past. Rutgers University Press.

Journal articles

- Allgor, C. (1997). "A Republican in a Monarchy": Louisa Catherine Adams in Russia. Diplomatic History, 21(1), 15–43.
- Allgor, C. (2000). "Queen Dolley" Saves Washington City. Washington History, 12(1), 54–69.
- Allgor, C. (2012). Margaret Bayard Smith’s 1809 Journey to Monticello and Montpelier: The Politics of Performance in the Early Republic. Early American Studies, 10(1), 30–68.
- Allgor, C. (2015). “Believing the Ladies Had Great Influence”: Early National American Women’s Patronage in Transatlantic Context. American Political Thought, 4(1), 39–71.

== See also ==
- Edith B. Gelles
- Amy S. Greenberg
- Monica Muñoz Martinez
