= Letitia Semple =

American society lady, educator and unofficial First Lady

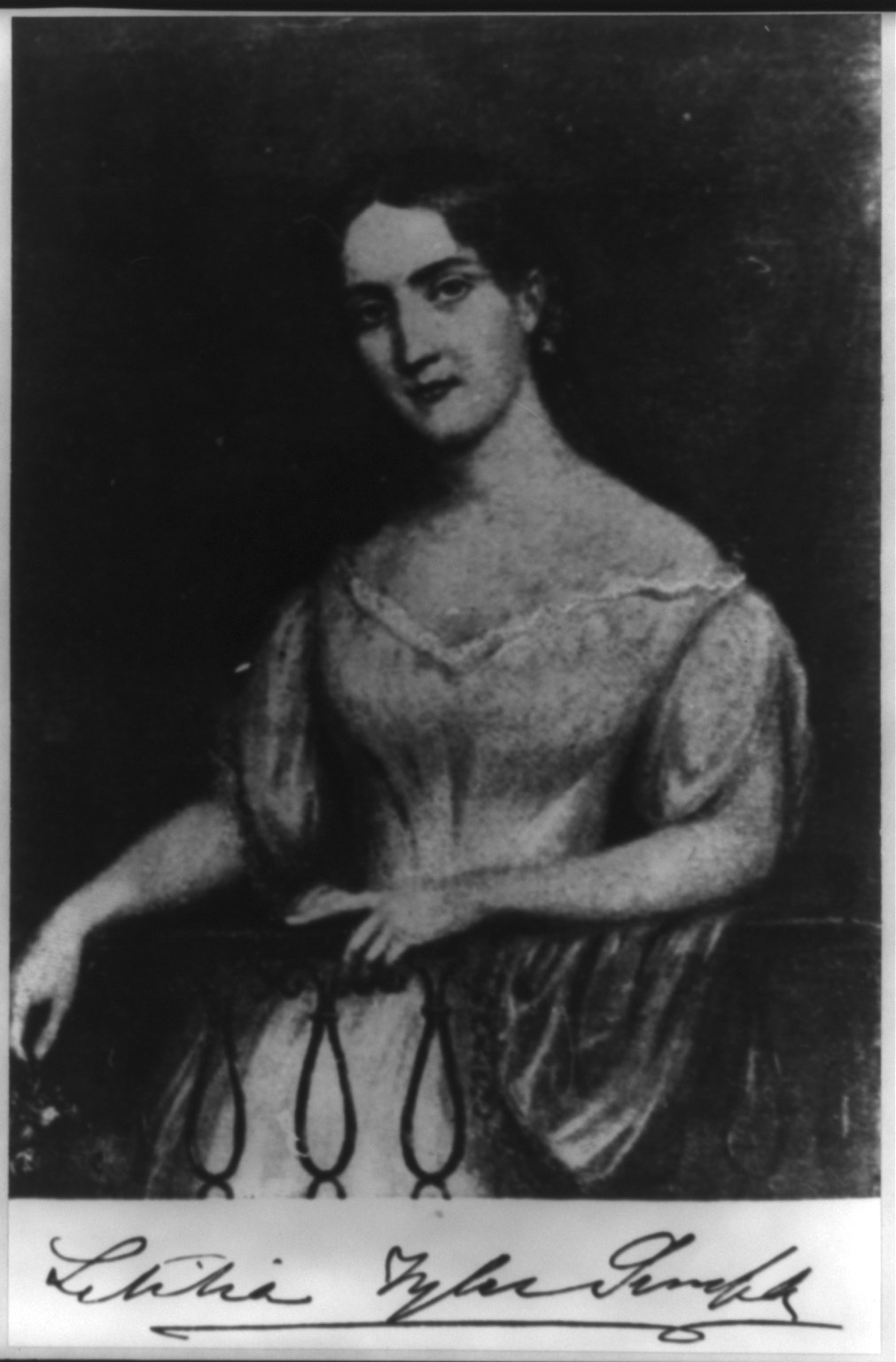
- Semple in 1850
- Born: Letitia Christian Tyler; May 11, 1821; Charles City County, Virginia, United States
- Died: December 28, 1907 (aged 86); Washington, DC, United States
- Known for: Acting as First Lady
- Spouse: James A. Semple
- Parent(s): John Tyler; Letitia Christian Tyler

Letitia "Letty" Christian Semple (née Tyler; May 11, 1821 – December 28, 1907) was an American society lady, educator, and briefly an unofficial First Lady during her father John Tyler's presidency. The National First Ladies' Library named Semple and her sister-in-law Priscilla Cooper Tyler "First ladies who never married presidents". Semple served in this role from March to June 1844.

Governor Robert Love Taylor described Semple as "The most notable Southern woman surviving the classic old régime".

== Biography ==
Semple was born Letitia Christian Tyler, Jr., to John Tyler (a son of John Tyler Sr.) and his first wife Letitia Christian Tyler on May 11, 1821, in Charles City County, Virginia. Nicknamed "Letty", she was their fourth child and second daughter.

In February 1839, Semple married James A. Semple at the age of 17. The Women's History Blog characterized their marriage as an unhappy one. When her father assumed the presidency on April 4, 1841, Semple and her husband had become estranged because of his mental illness, and she moved into the White House with her parents and siblings. Semple was a sister of Robert Tyler, who married Priscilla Cooper Tyler. Together Semple and Priscilla acted as unofficial First Ladies and White House hostesses after the death of Semple's mother Letitia Christian Tyler and before President Tyler married his second wife Julia Gardiner Tyler. This meant during President Tyler's one term as president, four ladies served as First Lady, though two were in that role unofficially. Semple served in this role from March to June 1844. Washingtonian writer Tevi Troy called it a "non-traditional First Lady arrangement". During her time hosting, The Chattanooga Times wrote "she was the friend of the most famous statesman and public men the country has produced..."

During the American Civil War, Semple served in Williamsburg, Virginia as a volunteer nurse for Confederate soldiers after the Battle of Manassas. At the end of the war, she opened a school, called the Eclectic Institute, located in Baltimore, Maryland. The Institute enrolled approximately 20 young ladies at a time.

Semple and her stepmother Julia Gardiner Tyler never got along; "Refusing to show her the most basic civility, [Semple] forever resented her stepmother and there would be no reconciliation."

=== Later life ===
In the 1870s, William Wilson Corcoran gave Semple room and board at the Louise Home, "which he created for elderly women of distinguished background who found themselves in genteel poverty." During this time, she was befriended by First Ladies Lucy Hayes and Ida McKinley, the latter of whom lent Semple her horse and carriage when needed. Semple and her husband never reconciled, and never had any children together. Semple died December 28, 1907, at the Louise House in Washington, DC. She was the last surviving child of John and Letitia Tyler.
