= John Alexander Tyler =

American engineer and son of US President John Tyler (1848-1883)

- Born: April 7, 1848
- Died: September 1, 1883 (aged 35); Santa Fe, New Mexico
- Parent(s): John Tyler; Julia Gardiner Tyler

John Alexander Tyler (April 7, 1848 – September 1, 1883) was an American engineer and the second son of President John Tyler and his second wife, Julia Gardiner Tyler. He was born at the Tyler estate, Sherwood Forest Plantation, near Charles City, Virginia.

== During the Civil War ==
After the death of his father, at age 14 he ran away from home to enlist in the Confederate States Army, but was rejected as too young. His mother, Julia Gardiner Tyler, eventually allowed him to join the Confederate States Navy because it had a lesser casualty rate than the Confederate Army. However, Tyler spent most of his time on a ship quarantined due to yellow fever and left naval service in 1864. After attending college for three months, he left and joined the First Virginia Battalion of Artillery under General Robert E. Lee, just prior to Lee's surrender at Appomattox, which effectively ended the war.

== In Europe ==
In 1865, he and his brother, David Gardiner Tyler, traveled to Germany to attend college, where he studied in Carlsruhe, Baden and Freiberg, Saxony to become a mining engineer. Still in Germany in 1870 at the outbreak of the Franco-Prussian War, Tyler enlisted in the Prussian Army and joined the First Uhlan regiment under the command of King John of Saxony. He served with distinction in the occupation of France in 1871.

== Later years ==
In 1873, Tyler returned to the United States and attempted to find work as a mining engineer near Salt Lake City, but was unable to find a position, probably due to the Depression of 1873–79. Although he did find a job with a railroad, the salary did not allow him to meet his debts, and he had financial problems until he married a wealthier third cousin, Sarah Griswold Gardiner, on August 5, 1875. The couple would have three children. These were, the stillborn John Alexander Tyler Jr.(1876), Samuel Gardiner Tyler(1878-1892), and Lilian Horsford Margraf(1879-1918). President Rutherford B. Hayes later appointed him as a surveyor for the United States Department of the Interior. In 1883, at 35 years old, Tyler died of a fever while working as a mining engineer in New Mexico.

== External sources ==
- Cameron, Mabel Ward (1922). Sarah Griswold Gardiner : (Mrs. John Alexander Tyler) the romance of family history : historic genealogical narrative. OCLC 427651102. NYPL Call No. NYGB AZ Fam 09-155.
- Jürgen Just: John Alexander Tyler (1848–1883), US-Präsidentensohn, Freiberger Montane und Karlsruher Bavare. Einst und Jetzt, Jahrbuch des Vereins für corpsstudentische Geschichtsforschung 65 (2020), S. 161–168 [in German]. ISBN 978-3-87707-182-3.
