= Exchange Hotel (Richmond, Virginia) =

1841 former hotel; site of the death of John Tyler

Coordinates: 37°32′9″N 77°25′52″W

The Exchange Hotel, completed in 1841 in Richmond, Virginia, was a Gothic revival four-story building designed by Isaiah Rogers. It was very popular before the Civil War.

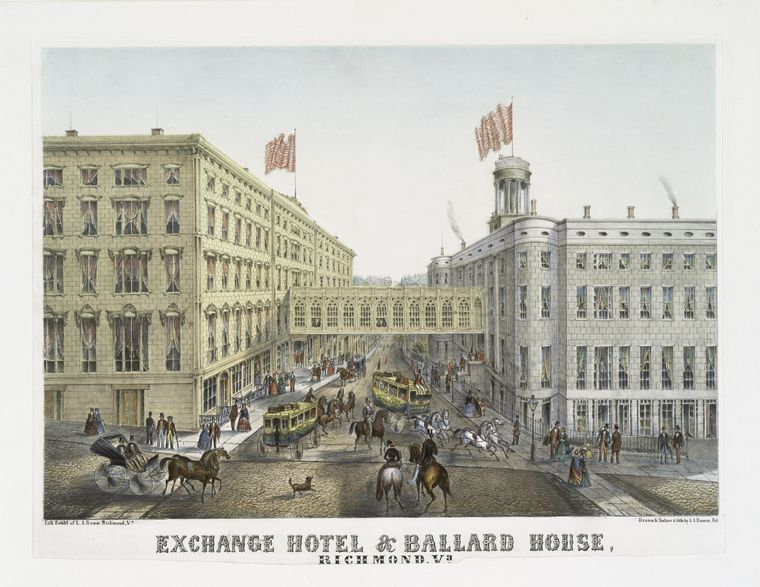

The Ballard House opened up across the street in 1855. This five-story Italianate faced onto Franklin Street at the corner of Fourteenth Street. Both establishments were owned by John P. Ballard (1816–1878). They were connected at the second level first by a footbridge made of steel, and some years later enclosed in brick. Their old architecture prevented them from being one of the premiere Richmond hotels at the time.

U.S. President John Tyler died at the Exchange Hotel in 1862. His wife, Julia, died there also, 27 years later.

It closed in 1896, thanks to competition from the newer Jefferson Hotel, and was demolished from 1900–1901.
