= Julia Gardiner Tyler =

First Lady of the United States from 1844 to 1845

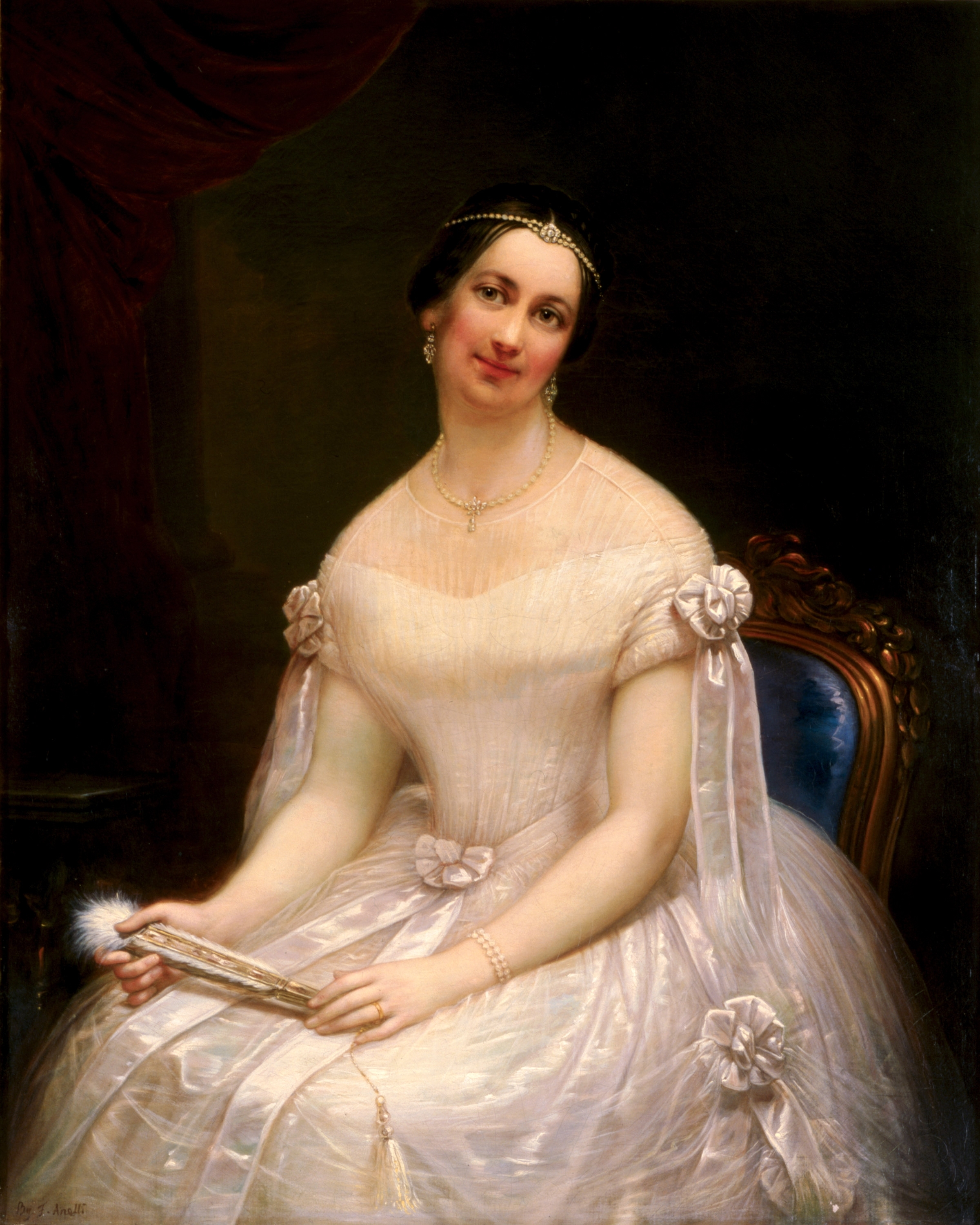
- Official portrait, 1844

First Lady of the United States
- In role June 26, 1844 – March 4, 1845
- President: John Tyler
- Preceded by: Priscilla Cooper Tyler (acting)
- Succeeded by: Sarah Childress Polk

Personal details
- Born: Julia Gardiner; May 4, 1820 Gardiner's Island, New York, U.S.
- Died: July 10, 1889 (aged 69) Richmond, Virginia, U.S.
- Resting place: Hollywood Cemetery, Richmond, Virginia, U.S.
- Spouse: John Tyler (m. 1844; died 1862)
- Children: 7
- Parent(s): David Gardiner; Juliana MacLachlan

Julia Gardiner Tyler (née Gardiner; May 4, 1820 – July 10, 1889) was the first lady of the United States from June 26, 1844, to March 4, 1845, as the second wife of President John Tyler. A member of the influential Gardiner family, Tyler had many figures as suitors. She met the widowed President Tyler in 1842, and agreed to marry him after he comforted her in the aftermath of her father David Gardiner's death. They married in secret, making her first lady immediately upon their marriage, serving in the role for the final eight months of his presidency.

Tyler was delighted with her role as first lady, redecorating the White House and establishing her own "court" of ladies-in-waiting to mimic the practices of European monarchies she had visited years before. She also established the tradition of playing "Hail to the Chief" when the president arrived at an event, and she popularized the waltz and polka dances in the United States. Tyler was a fierce advocate for her husband's political priorities, organizing social events to lobby Congressmen, particularly for the Texas annexation. She is credited with revitalizing the position of first lady, both socially and politically, after several inactive first ladies before her.

After leaving the White House, Tyler moved to the Sherwood Forest Plantation in Virginia with her husband and had seven children. She became a prominent supporter of slavery in the United States, writing an influential pamphlet in 1853 that defended the practice. During the American Civil War, Tyler provided support to the Confederate States of America, creating a permanent rift with her family in New York. After the war, she was involved in a legal dispute regarding her mother's estate with her brother, who had been a loyal Unionist. Tyler returned to Washington in the 1870s as her reputation recovered, assisting first lady Julia Grant at the White House and convincing Congress to provide a pension for widowed first ladies. She spent her final years in Richmond, Virginia, living there in poor health. Tyler died of a stroke on July 10, 1889, in the same hotel where her husband had died from the same illness 27 years before.

== Early life ==
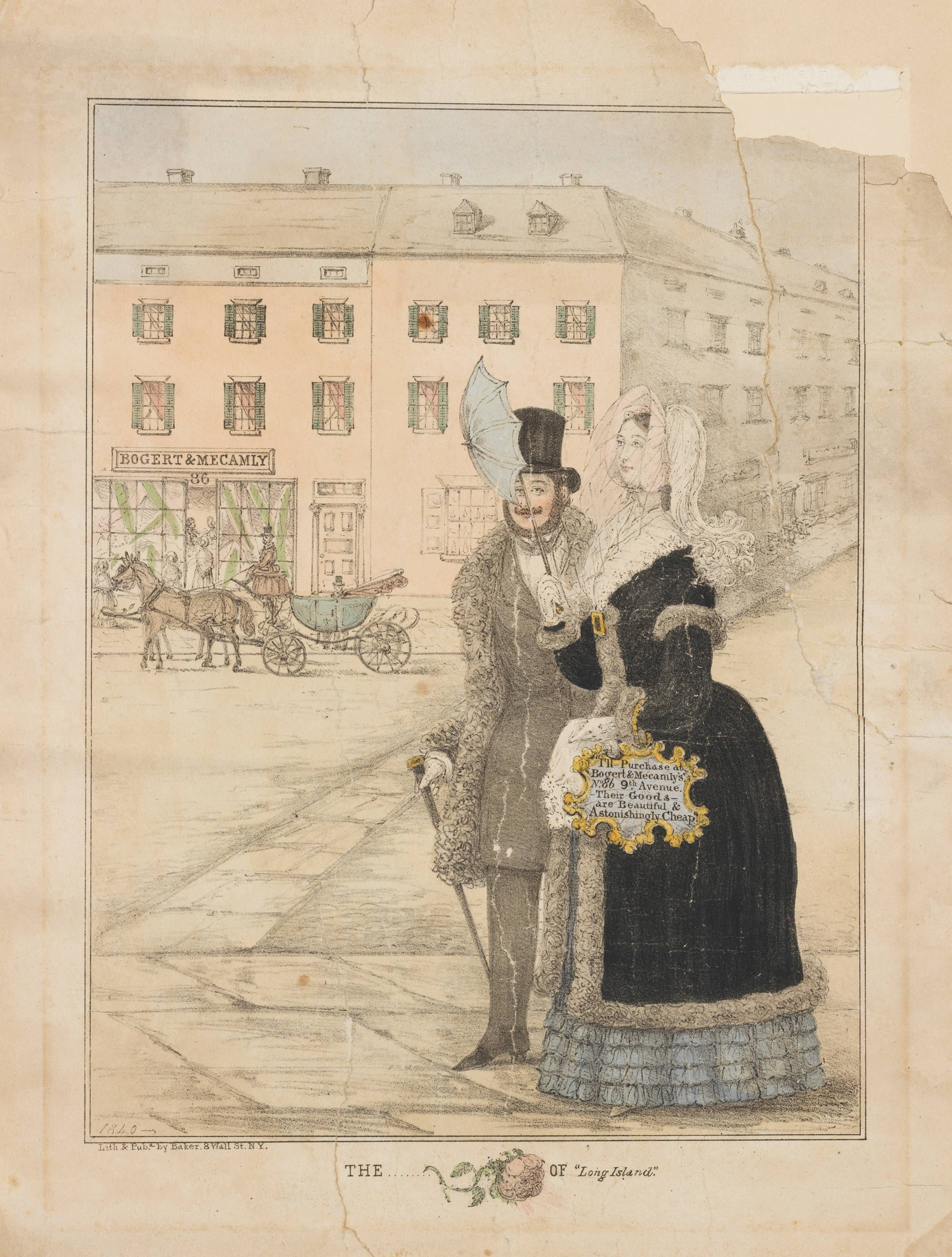
The advertisement for which Julia Gardiner posed

Julia Gardiner was born on May 4, 1820, on Gardiner's Island in New York to David Gardiner, a landowner and New York State senator (1824–1828), and Juliana MacLachlan Gardiner. Her ancestry was Dutch, Scottish, and English, and she was the third of four children. The Gardiners were a wealthy and influential family, and she was taught to value social class and advantageous marriages. She was educated at home until she was 16 years old, and she then attended the Chagaray Institute in New York, where she studied music, French literature, ancient history, arithmetic, and composition. She was raised as a Presbyterian.

As a young woman Gardiner closely followed fashions. She was introduced in Saratoga Springs, New York at the age of 15. In 1840, she shocked polite society by appearing in an advertisement for a department store, posed with an unidentified man and identified as "The Rose of Long Island". Her family took her to Europe, possibly to avoid further publicity, while the nickname "Rose of Long Island" became permanently associated with Gardiner. They first left for London, arriving on October 29, 1840. They visited England, France, Italy, Switzerland, Germany, The Netherlands, Belgium, Ireland, and Scotland before returning to New York in September 1841. While in France, she was presented to the French court, adding to her list of suitors. After returning from Europe, the Gardiners spent time in Washington, D.C.

== Courtship and wedding ==
=== Courtship with President Tyler ===
In Washington, Gardiner and her sister Margaret accumulated so many suitors that an extra room had to be rented to entertain them. She continued to make visits to Washington over the following years. Gardiner received marriage proposals from several prominent figures, including two congressmen, a Supreme Court justice, and President John Tyler.

She first met Tyler in January 1842, when she was introduced to him at a White House reception. On Gardiner's request, her family spent more time in Washington, returning in 1843. President Tyler invited Gardiner to a private game of cards on February 7, 1843, after which he playfully chased her around the tables. After his first wife Letitia Christian Tyler had died, President Tyler made it clear that he wished to be romantically involved with Gardiner. Though the Gardiner and Tyler families grew closer, Julia initially felt little attraction to the president, who was 30 years her senior. The increased time that Gardiner and President Tyler spent together prompted public speculation about their relationship. He first proposed to her at a White House Masquerade Ball on February 22, 1843, when she was 22 years old. She refused that and later proposals he made, though they reached an understanding by the following month that they would someday be wed.

On February 22, 1844, Gardiner, her sister Margaret, and their father David joined a presidential excursion on the new steam frigate Princeton. During this excursion, David Gardiner, along with others, was killed in the explosion of a huge naval gun called the Peacemaker. Gardiner is said to have fainted after learning of him dying, having President Tyler carry her off the ship. While she grieved over the death, even Gardiner acknowledged that the president had become a surrogate father. She became much more receptive to his advances over the following weeks, and agreed to marry him.

=== Wedding of Julia Gardiner and John Tyler ===
It was decided that the wedding of Gardiner and Tyler would be carried out in secret. They were wed on June 26, 1844, at the Church of the Ascension in New York. The wedding was controversial when it was announced to the public. It was the first time that a president had married while holding the office, and critics felt that it was inappropriate for him to remarry while he was president, so shortly after the death of his first wife. Their age difference was also a subject of criticism: President Tyler was 54 years old, while Gardiner was 24. Some, such as Congressman and former President John Quincy Adams, mocked the president for marrying a young bride so soon after meeting her. Julia Tyler's new stepchildren were dismayed by the marriage, especially as some of them were older than she and it was so soon after their mother's death. Her stepdaughters in particular were distrustful, though she was ultimately accepted by all of them with the exception of Letitia Semple. After her marriage, Tyler determined that she would give up being a New Yorker and identify instead as a Virginian like her husband.

== First Lady of the United States ==
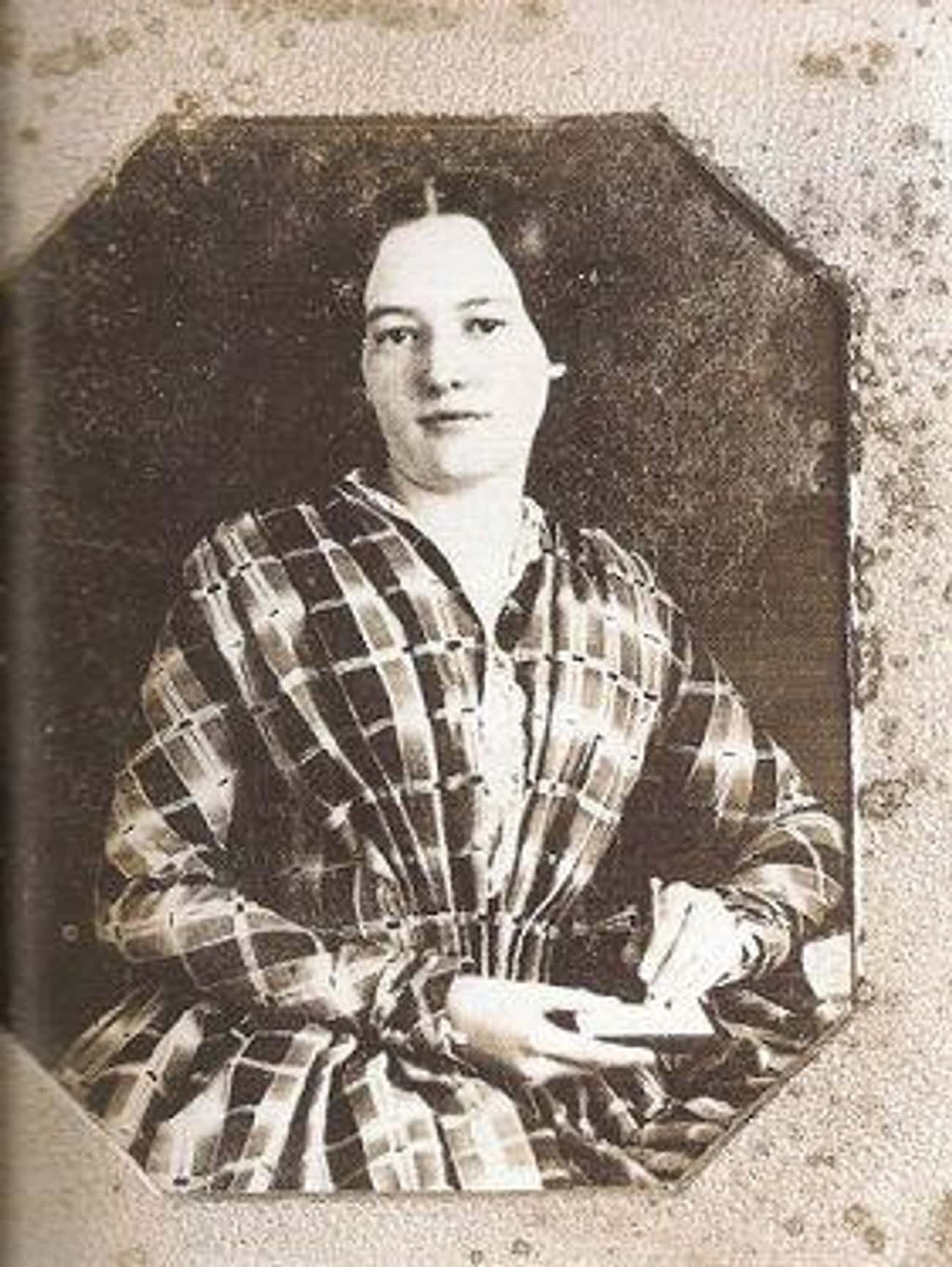
An unverified daguerreotype suggested to be of Julia Tyler while she was first lady of the United States

=== White House hostess ===
As the wife of the president, Julia Tyler served as first lady of the United States for the final eight months of his presidency. After their marriage, they honeymooned in Washington, Old Point Comfort, and the president's privately owned Sherwood Forest Plantation. Tyler was enthralled by the crowds that followed them and the public interest in their secret wedding. After arriving at the White House, she sought to make the presidential home more extravagant; she had the building cleaned, the furniture replaced, and the staff uniforms updated. Access to the Gardiner family fortune allowed her to remake the White House more than would have otherwise been possible. She also purchased many elaborate dresses at personal expense, becoming a prominent influence in fashion. The extravagance was muted, however, by her period of mourning for her father.

Tyler's sister Margaret assisted her while visiting Washington, serving as a social secretary. Tyler became a point of contact for those wishing to receive favors from the president, and the Gardiner family in particular regularly sought support from the first lady. Among her favorite requests were those for pardons and commutations by the president, and it was Tyler's interjection that spared a convict, "Babe" the pirate, from a death sentence in New York. Tyler was often the subject of human-interest stories, particularly those by Washington correspondent F. W. Thomas of the New York Herald. Thomas' coverage of her was consistently positive, and he bestowed upon her the nickname "Lady Presidentress," with which she was popularly identified.

=== Political influence ===
Tyler did not have strong political views of her own. Rather, she adopted and defended those of her husband. She encouraged her husband to pursue whatever policies he desired, and she would even flatter members of the Senate to win their support. Political considerations were always factored into social events, and Tyler used her influence to exert power in her own right. In particular, she lobbied for the annexation of Texas as she believed it would benefit her husband's legacy. Her open expression of political opinion diverged from previous first ladies, who generally expressed little interest in politics. After the president signed off on the annexation of Texas in one of his final official acts, Tyler began wearing the pen he used around her neck. Her lobbying on the Texas issue is credited as a major factor in its success. Her support for the annexation of Texas became publicly known to the point where she was identified with the topic, and it was the subject of the first political cartoon to tie a first lady to a political issue.

=== Public image ===
As first lady, Tyler wished to emulate the customs of European courts. She had her own court formed from her sister, her cousins, and her daughter-in-law, who served as her ladies-in-waiting, and she invited ladies of prominent families to join her at events and receiving lines. She also kept an Italian Greyhound that accompanied her, which the president had ordered for her from Naples. Her sense of extravagance was also noted when she drove four horses and when she received guests on an armchair that was slightly elevated. To bring an element of grandiose to the presidency, she began the tradition of a presidential anthem, having "Hail to the Chief" played to announce the entry of the president.

Tyler broke social norms by dancing in public, which was considered scandalous by the country's Puritan tradition. Her love for the polka helped popularize the dance in the United States. She also introduced the waltz to White House events despite the president's previous opposition to dancing. Several "Julia Waltzes" were written in her honor and saw wide success. Though Tyler was generally popular as first lady, her love of drinking and dancing earned her the ire of religious citizens amidst the Second Great Awakening. In the last month of her husband's administration, Tyler hosted a grand White House ball for 3,000 guests.

== Post-presidency ==
=== Motherhood at Sherwood Forest Plantation ===
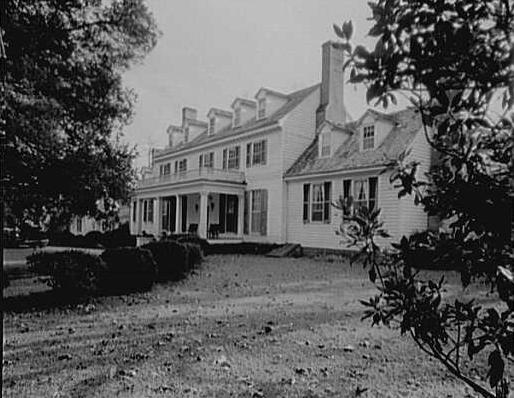
Sherwood Forest Plantation in Charles City County, Virginia, where the Tylers lived after leaving the White House

After leaving the White House, the Tylers retired to the Sherwood Forest Plantation. Although a Northerner by birth, Tyler adopted her new Southern identity wholeheartedly, saying that she was "ashamed" of New York. The Tylers had seven children together after leaving the White House: David Gardiner Tyler in 1846, John Alexander Tyler in 1848, Julia Gardiner Tyler in 1849, Lachlan Tyler in 1851, Lyon Gardiner Tyler in 1853, Robert Fitzwalter Tyler in 1856, and Pearl Tyler in 1860.

Tyler was responsible for the care of not only her seven children, but several of her adult stepchildren. The Sherwood Forest Planation was maintained by two hired workers, and via force, approximately 70 enslaved people. Tyler often hosted social gatherings and long-term guests at their home, and the family regularly traveled throughout the United States for vacation and for speaking engagements. She also carried out renovations on their home, their boat, and their carriage. Tyler eventually bought the Villa Margaret summer home in Hampton, Virginia to accommodate their growing family. The Tylers spent beyond their means, depleting the Gardiner fortune and plunging them into financial trouble for much of their marriage.

When several women of the British aristocracy published an open letter challenging slavery in the Southern United States, Tyler wrote a response that defended slavery, publishing it in the Southern Literary Messenger in 1853. In this response, Tyler claimed that slaves in the South lived better than the English working classes at the time. Such a public expression of political opinion was unusual for a woman in the Southern United States, but the nature of the slavery debate won acceptance for her essay among the South. In the North, she was regarded as a doughface, a disparaging term for a Northerner that supported the South. In response to Tyler's essay, Harriet Jacobs, a former slave and later abolitionist writer, authored her first published work, a letter to the New York Tribune in 1853.

=== Civil War ===
Though their allegiance was with the South, the Tylers did not want the Southern states to secede in the buildup to the Civil War. They went to Washington in early 1861 to alleviate the crisis, with Tyler involving herself in the city's social life to help improve Northern–Southern relations. By February, however, Tyler and her husband accepted secession and aligned themselves with the Confederate States of America. She volunteered to support the Confederate war effort during the civil war, and she cut ties with her family in New York when they remained loyal to the Union. She became further opposed to the Union after Union soldiers captured her summer home Villa Margaret.

When a nightmare caused her to worry for her husband's health while he was away, Tyler joined him at the Confederate House of Representatives in Richmond, Virginia. He died of a stroke on January 18, 1862, at the age of 71, days after she arrived. Tyler hired a manager and two employees to tend to Sherwood Forest Plantation. Then with her two youngest children, she traveled to Bermuda where she lived with other Confederates who had settled there, and she returned to her family home in New York in November 1862 She bitterly argued with her Unionist brother, who was eventually banished from the house after striking her. Tyler was upset to hear that Sherwood Forest Plantation had been captured while she was in New York, that her former slaves had been given the crops that they grew, and that the building was being used as a desegregated school.

Tyler continued to support the Confederacy throughout the war, making donations to the Confederate Army and distributing pamphlets in support of the cause. The day after the assassination of President Abraham Lincoln in 1865, three men broke into her home demanding that she turn over her Confederate flag, searching for it after she denied having one. She suspected her brother of orchestrating the attack. The Tylers remained unpopular after the war for supporting the Confederacy, so the Tyler children were sent out of the country for schooling.

=== Later life and death ===
Tyler's mother died in October 1864, writing a new will while she was on her deathbed. Tyler's brother challenged the will, arguing that Tyler had exerted "undue influence" over their mother. The dispute was resolved in 1868, when she was granted the Gardiner-Tyler House in Staten Island and three-eighths of the family's property in New York City. She moved into the Gardiner-Tyler House and lived there until 1874. Tyler was also involved in a separate legal battle to regain her summerhouse Villa Margaret, which she eventually won back in 1869. After trying to sell it to President Ulysses S. Grant, she was forced to sell Villa Margaret at a loss.

Tyler resumed her social life in Washington in the 1870s as the stigma of her Confederate sympathies subsided. She sometimes attended White House events, supporting first lady Julia Grant as hostess. In 1870, Tyler donated a portrait of herself to the White House, starting the first ladies portrait collection. In 1872, Tyler moved to Georgetown. Seeking meaning later in life, she and her daughter Pearl converted from the Tyler family's Episcopalianism to Roman Catholicism in 1872. The economic depression that followed the Panic of 1873 depleted her finances, forcing her to sell her other properties so she could purchase Sherwood Forest Plantation back from the Bank of Virginia that had come to control it. She lobbied Congress for a pension and was granted a monthly allowance in 1880. Following the assassination of President James Garfield in 1881, Congress granted an annual pension of $5,000 to widows of former presidents.

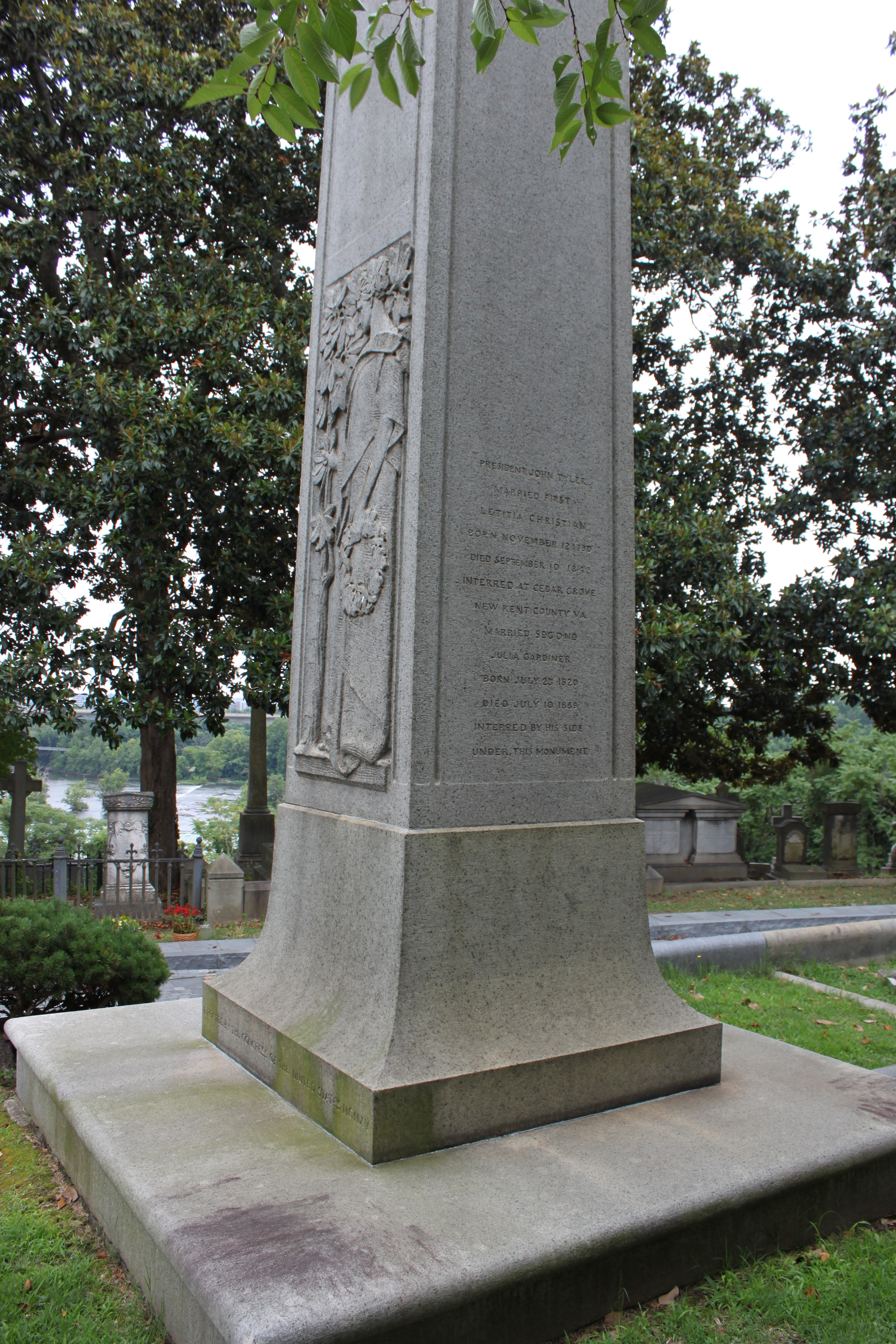
Grave of John Tyler and Julia Gardiner Tyler at Hollywood Cemetery

In 1882, Tyler moved to Richmond, Virginia. Toward the end of her life, she suffered from malaria. She made her final visit to Washington in 1887, when she met with first lady Frances Cleveland, to whom she would sometimes provide advice. Tyler suffered a stroke and died on July 10, 1889, while she was staying at the Exchange Hotel—the same hotel where her husband had died of a stroke 27 years before. She was buried next to him at Hollywood Cemetery in Richmond. Tyler had lived the longest post-White House life of any first lady, living another 44 years after leaving the White House. She held this record until it was overtaken by Frances Cleveland.

== Legacy ==
The papers of the Tyler family, including Julia Gardiner Tyler, are held by the Special Collections Research Center at the College of William and Mary. Tyler's son Lyon, like his father, married his second wife late in life. As a result, Julia Tyler had two grandsons who survived into the 21st century: Lyon Jr. died in September 2020, while Harrison Ruffin Tyler died in May 2025.

Tyler was generally well received during her time as first lady, and she is credited with revitalizing social life in Washington after the death of her husband's first wife. She also provided a level of extravagance to the presidency, but she did little to change or expand the substance of the role of first lady. Instead, she strongly affected the role's imagery, incorporating regal elements. She is recognized as one of the most successful hostesses in the history of the White House due to her charm and the grandiosity of her parties, and she was one of the earliest first ladies to be directly active in politics. Her prominence in Washington has prompted greater historical interest in her life compared to the less active presidential wives that immediately preceded her.

=== Regard by historians ===
Since 1982 Siena College Research Institute has periodically conducted surveys asking historians to assess American first ladies according to a cumulative score on the independent criteria of their background, value to the country, intelligence, courage, accomplishments, integrity, leadership, being their own women, public image, and value to the president. Consistently, Tyler has been ranked in the lower half of first ladies by historians in these surveys. In terms of cumulative assessment, Tyler has been ranked:

- 27th of 42 in 1982
- 27th of 37 in 1993
- 26th of 38 in 2003
- 28th of 38 in 2008
- 27th of 39 in 2014
- 31st of 40 in 2020

In the 2014 survey, Tyler and her husband were ranked the 34th out of 39 first couples in terms of being a "power couple".

== See also ==
- Bibliography of United States presidential spouses and first ladies
- Bibliography of John Tyler

== Notes ==
Honorary titles
Preceded by Priscilla Tyler; Acting	First Lady of the United States; 1844–1845	Succeeded by Sarah Polk
