= Robert Tyler (Confederate Register of the Treasury) =

Confederate Register of the Treasury (1816–1877)

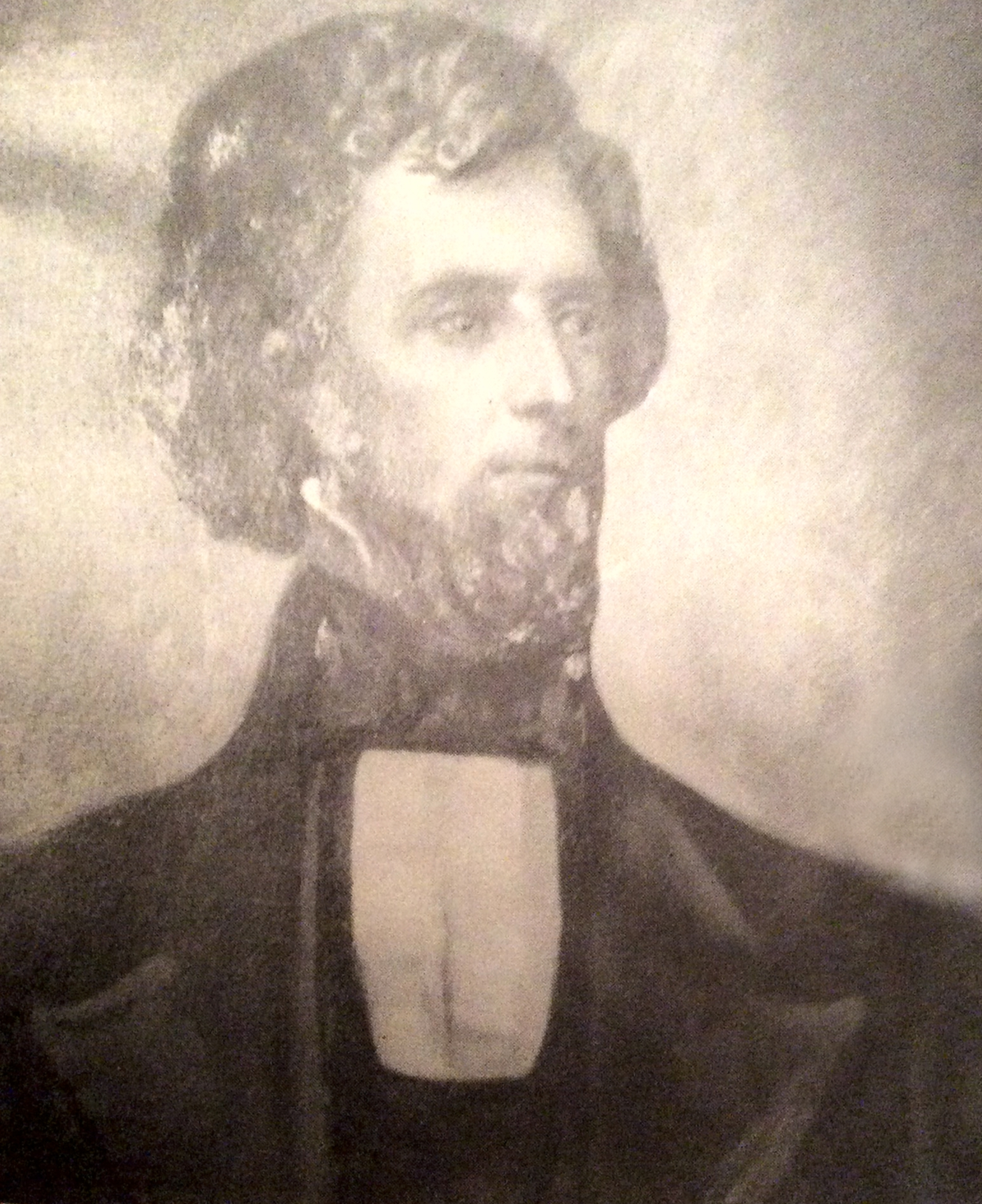

Secretary to the President of the United States
- In office 1841 – March 4, 1845
- Preceded by: Henry Huntington Harrison
- Succeeded by: Joseph Knox Walker

Confederate Register of the Treasury
- In office 1861–1865
- Preceded by: Position established
- Succeeded by: Position abolished

Personal details
- Born: September 9, 1816
- Died: December 3, 1877 (aged 61)
- Spouse: Priscilla Cooper (m. 1839)
- Children: 9

Robert Tyler (September 9, 1816 – December 3, 1877) was the eldest son of John Tyler, the tenth President of the United States, and Letitia Christian Tyler. He served as the Confederate Register of the Treasury during the American Civil War. Previously, Tyler served as private secretary for his father's presidential administration. In later life he served as the editor of a newspaper in Montgomery, Alabama.

His wife, Priscilla, served in place of the First Lady of the United States from September 10, 1842, to June 26, 1844, between the death of her mother-in-law and President Tyler's remarriage to Julia Gardiner Tyler. Together Robert and Priscilla Tyler had nine children, only six of whom achieved adulthood.
