= Amy S. Greenberg =

American historian (born 1968)

Amy S. Greenberg (born 1968) is an American historian, and Edwin Erle Sparks Professor of History and Women's Studies, at Pennsylvania State University.

== Life ==
She graduated from the University of California at Berkeley and earned her PhD at Harvard University.

== Awards ==
She was awarded a 2009 Guggenheim fellowship.

She received the Robert M. Utley Prize in 2013 from the Western History Association for A Wicked War: Polk, Clay, Lincoln, and the 1846 U.S. Invasion of Mexico.

== Works ==
- Cause for Alarm: The Volunteer Fire Department in the Nineteenth-Century City. Princeton University Press. 1998. ISBN 978-0-691-01648-1.
- Manifest Manhood and the Antebellum American Empire. Cambridge University Press. 6 June 2005. ISBN 978-0-521-84096-5.
- Manifest Destiny and American Territorial Expansion: A Brief History with Documents. Bedford/St. Martin's. 23 December 2011. ISBN 978-0-312-60048-8.
- A Wicked War: Polk, Clay, Lincoln, and the 1846 U.S. Invasion of Mexico. Knopf Doubleday Publishing Group. 6 November 2012. ISBN 978-0-307-96091-7.
- Lady First: The World of First Lady Sarah Polk. New York: Knopf. 2019. ISBN 978-0385354134.
