= An act relating to revenue cutters and steamers =

First overridden veto by US Congress

- Long title: An act relating to revenue cutters and steamers
- Enacted by: the 28th United States Congress

Citations
- Statutes at Large: 5 Stat. 795

Legislative history
- Introduced in the Senate; Vetoed by President John Tyler on February 20, 1845; Overridden by the Senate on March 3, 1845 (41-1); Overridden by the House of Representatives and became law on March 3, 1845 (127-30)

An act relating to revenue cutters and steamers, ch. 78, 5 Stat. 795, is an Act of Congress from March 3, 1845, which became the first bill passed after Congress overrode a presidential veto.

The Act stated: "no revenue cutter or revenue steamer shall hereafter be built (excepting such as are now in the course of building and equipment) nor purchased, unless an appropriation be first made, by law, therefor."
