= Charles City Rifles =

- Active: Summer 1813 – late 1813
- Country: United States
- Branch: Virginia Militia
- Type: Militia
- Size: Company
- Part of: 52nd Regiment of the Virginia Militia (1813); Second Elite Corps of Virginia (1813)
- Engagements: War of 1812: March on Williamsburg

Commanders
- Notable commanders: Captain John Tyler

The Charles City Rifles was a volunteer militia unit that was created in the summer of 1813 during the War of 1812. It was commanded by future president John Tyler.

== History ==
At the onset of the War of 1812, Charles City County representative John Tyler gave a speech to the Virginia House of Delegates, urging support for military action. After British forces captured the city of Hampton, Virginia in the summer of 1813, Tyler joined a militia company known as the Charles City Rifles and made himself the company commander with the rank of captain.

The majority of the Charles City Rifles consisted of farmers, who Tyler had to introduce to military drill.

The Charles City Rifles was attached to the 52nd Regiment of the Virginia Militia and marched on Williamsburg, however, the Charles City Rifles did not see any combat actions during the march. Later, the Charles City Rifles was attached to the Second Elite Corps of Virginia, which was under the command of General Moses Green.

After the expected British attack on Richmond never came, the Charles City Rifles were disbanded, only two months after it was formed. However, due to his service, Tyler received a land grant near what would later become Sioux City.
