= Inauguration of William Henry Harrison =

14th United States presidential inauguration

Presidential inauguration of William Henry Harrison
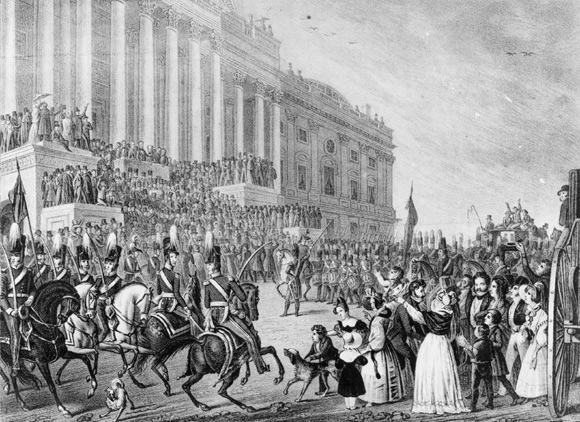
- Date: March 4, 1841; 185 years ago
- Location: United States Capitol, Washington, D.C.
- Participants: William Henry Harrison; 9th president of the United States — Assuming office Roger B. Taney; Chief Justice of the United States — Administering oath John Tyler; 10th vice president of the United States — Assuming office William R. King; President pro tempore of the United States Senate — Administering oath

The inauguration of William Henry Harrison as the ninth president of the United States was held on Thursday, March 4, 1841, at the East Portico of the United States Capitol in Washington, D.C. This was the 14th inauguration and marked the commencement of the only four-year term of both William Henry Harrison as president and John Tyler as vice president. The presidential oath of office was administered to Harrison by Chief Justice Roger B. Taney. Harrison died 31 days into his term, the first U.S. president to die in office and has the shortest presidential term in American history. Tyler then succeeded to the presidency, creating a precedent which would be followed seven more times before it was officially regulated through the Twenty-fifth Amendment in 1967.

== Details ==
Harrison was known as the famous general who had vanquished the legendary Native American warrior Tecumseh and secured the Northwest territory. He won the presidency featuring the campaign slogan "Tippecanoe and Tyler too", referring to the battle of Tippecanoe.

Harrison's inauguration was marked by several novelties; he was the first president-elect to arrive in Washington, D.C. by train, and for the first time an official inaugural committee of citizens had formed to plan the day's parade and inaugural ball.

At 68 years, 23 days of age at the time of his inauguration, he was the oldest president-elect to take office until Ronald Reagan in 1981.

Harrison's wife, Anna, was too ill to travel when her husband left Ohio for his inauguration, and she decided not to accompany him to Washington. Harrison asked his daughter-in-law Jane Irwin Harrison, widow of his namesake son, to accompany him and act as hostess until Anna's proposed arrival in May.

The outgoing president Martin Van Buren did not attend Harrison's inauguration, making him the third president up to that time to do so (John Adams and John Quincy Adams being the others). While Van Buren and Harrison were on good personal terms, Van Buren was still dissatisfied over the Whig party's attacks on him during the campaign. His son Martin Jr. was also ill, which may have led him to skip the ceremony. Instead, he stayed at the Capitol signing legislation until just before the ceremony began.

The day of the inauguration was overcast with cold wind and a noon temperature estimated to be 48 °F (9 °C), but the president-elect chose to not wear an overcoat, hat, or gloves for the ceremony. Harrison delivered the longest inaugural address to date, running 8,445 words. He wrote the entire speech himself, though it was edited by soon-to-be Secretary of State, Daniel Webster. Webster said afterwards that in the process of reducing the text, he had "killed seventeen Roman proconsuls". That evening Harrison attended three inaugural balls, including one at Carusi's Saloon entitled the "Tippecanoe" ball, which at a price of US$10 per person attracted 1000 guests.

On March 26, Harrison developed a cold. According to the prevailing medical misconception of that time, it was believed that his illness was directly caused by the bad weather at his inauguration; however, Harrison's illness did not arise until more than three weeks after the event. Despite doctors' attempts at treating him, Harrison died on April 4 from pneumonia that developed from the cold. The first president to die in office, his presidency was, and remains, the shortest in American history.

== See also ==
- Presidency of William Henry Harrison
- 1840 United States presidential election
