= Anna Harrison =

First Lady of the United States in 1841

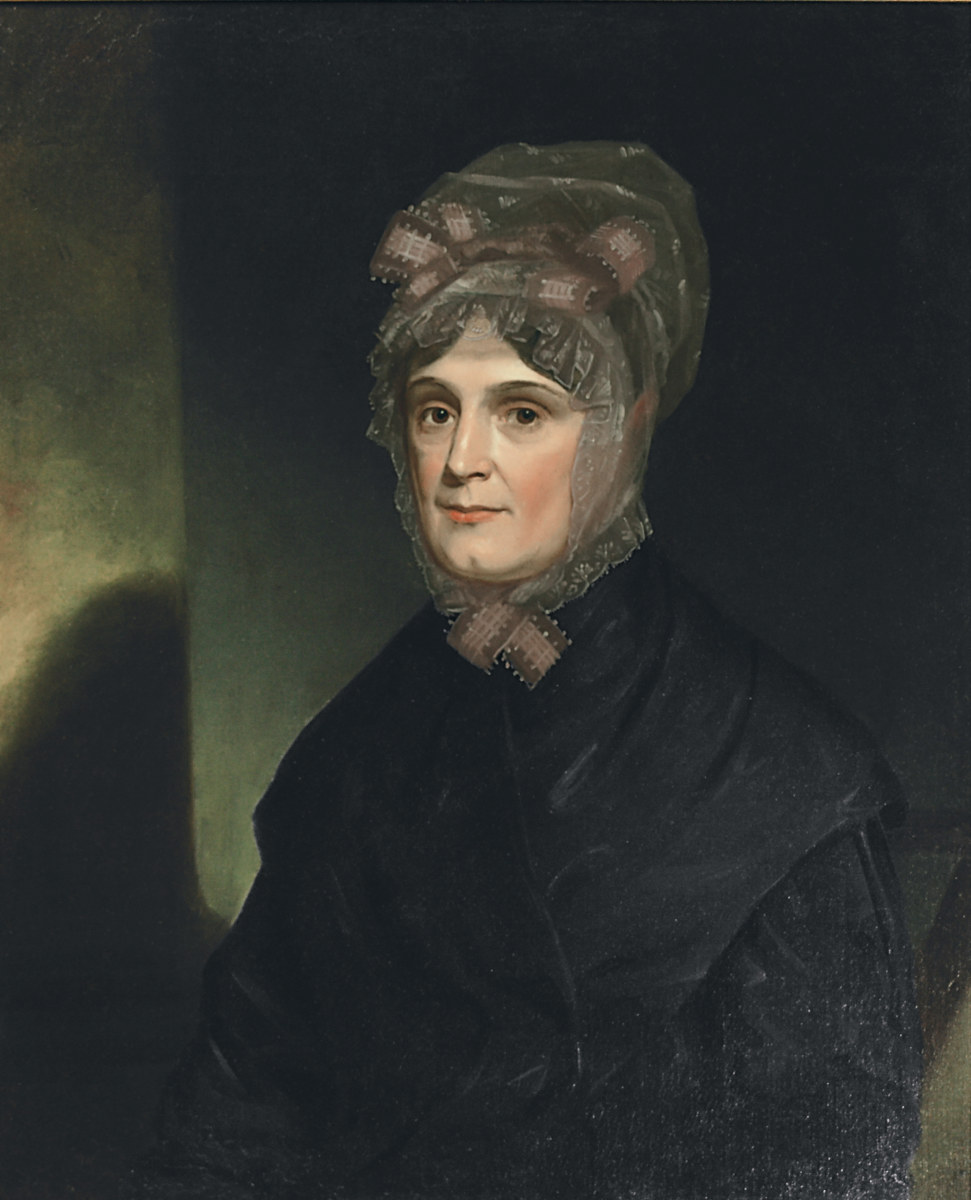
- Harrison c. 1820

First Lady of the United States
- In role March 4, 1841 – April 4, 1841 Serving with Jane Irwin Harrison
- President: William Henry Harrison
- Preceded by: Angelica Van Buren
- Succeeded by: Letitia Christian Tyler

First Lady of the Territory of Indiana
- In role January 10, 1801 – December 28, 1812
- Governor: William Henry Harrison
- Preceded by: Position established
- Succeeded by: Mary Posey

Personal details
- Born: Anna Tuthill Symmes; July 25, 1775 Morristown, New Jersey, British America
- Died: February 25, 1864 (aged 88) North Bend, Ohio, U.S.
- Resting place: Harrison Tomb State Memorial
- Spouse: William Henry Harrison (m. 1795; died 1841)
- Children: 10, including John Scott
- Parents: John Cleves Symmes; Anna Tuthill

Anna Tuthill Harrison (née Symmes; July 25, 1775 – February 25, 1864) was the first lady of the United States in 1841 as the wife of President William Henry Harrison. She served in the role for only one month, as her husband contracted pneumonia and died shortly after his term began.

Their son John Scott Harrison was the father of President Benjamin Harrison. She never entered the White House during her tenure as first lady, remaining the only presidential wife to never visit the capital during her husband's presidency. At age 65 when her husband's presidential term began, Harrison was the oldest woman ever to assume the role of first lady, a record held until Jill Biden became first lady at age 69 in 2021. She also has the distinction of holding the title for the shortest length of time, and the first first lady to be widowed while holding the title. Harrison was the only First Lady of the United States to have been the wife of one U.S. President and the grandmother of another U.S. President.

Anna was raised by her grandparents on Long Island and given an education better than any other first lady had yet received. She married military officer William Henry Harrison against her father's wishes in 1795, and she raised their family of ten children in the frontier of Ohio and Indiana while William pursued a political career. Eight of Anna's ten children died in her lifetime, causing her to become more deeply involved in her Presbyterian faith. She became first lady when William became president in 1841, though she did not attend his inauguration. William died while Anna was preparing to travel to Washington, D.C., only one month into his term. Anna lived the remainder of her life in Ohio, first in their family log cabin, and then with her only surviving son, John. Her short tenure as first lady, her absence from the White House, and the destruction of her personal papers in a fire have caused her to be overlooked by historians, and her life has been the subject of relatively little scholarly analysis.

== Early life ==
Anna Tuthill Symmes was born on July 25, 1775, in Morristown, New Jersey, as the second child of Anna Tuthill and John Cleves Symmes. Her father was an associate justice on the Supreme Court of New Jersey. Her mother died on her first birthday, leaving her father to raise her alone. When the American Revolutionary War began, John was a colonel in the Continental Army. To ensure his daughter's safety, he assumed the guise of a British soldier and transported her to Long Island via horseback. Here she was raised by her maternal grandparents. One rumor suggested that John carried two bags: one with Anna, and one with turnips that he showed to any soldiers who questioned him, claiming that he was delivering them to the British commander.

As a child, Anna first attended Clinton Academy in East Hampton and then the private school of Isabella Graham in New York City. Her education was religious in nature, as her grandparents raised her to be a Presbyterian. Once the war ended in 1783, Anna's father paid her a brief visit in New York before relocating to the Northwest Territory. She reunited with her father in 1794 at the age of 19 when she moved to the Northwest Territory to live with him in the town that he had established there: North Bend, Ohio. Also present was her stepmother, Susannah Livingston, with whom Anna got along well.

== Marriage and family ==
Symmes met William Henry Harrison during a visit to Lexington, Kentucky, to see her sister Maria. Despite her father's disapproval, she began a courtship with him. Her father disapproved of the courtship because of Harrison's military career. His experience with the soldiers of the Northwest Territory convinced him that they were little more than criminals, and he feared that Harrison's lack of experience in any other field would make it difficult to provide for a family.

Symmes and Harrison decided to elope while her father was away on business. They were married on November 25, 1795, with Dr. Stephen Wood presiding. The ceremony may have been in the home of the presiding minister or at the home of Anna's father; historians disagree on the exact location. Anna's father was displeased, and weeks went by before he finally spoke to his new son-in-law, demanding to know how he would support a family with Anna. William responded that he would use his sword. (Note: William Henry Harrison's exact answer is variously quoted as: "by my sword, and my own right arm, sir"; "my sword is my means of support, sir"; or "with my sword, sir, and my good right arm".) John's animosity toward William did not last. He eventually campaigned on his behalf and named him an executor of his estate.

Anna accompanied William when he returned to the nearby Fort Washington where he was stationed. She lived the traditional life of an army wife, including the associated travel with her husband. In 1798, William resigned from the army, purchased land in North Bend, and built a log cabin for their home. At this point they had their first child, who had been born in 1796. They eventually had ten children together over a period of 18 years. Eight of them preceded Anna in death.

== Husband's rise to fame ==
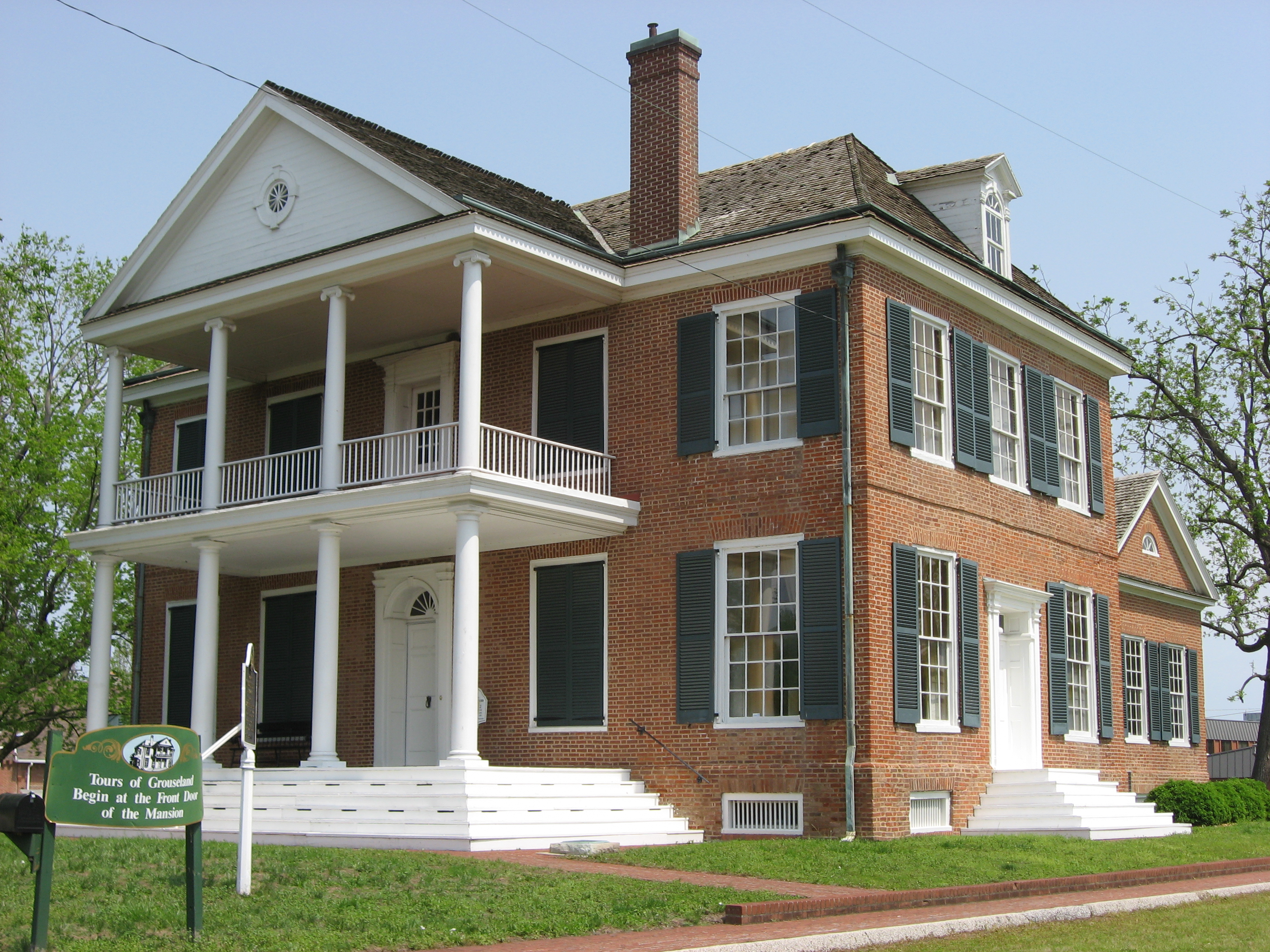
Grouseland, the Harrison home in Vincennes

After William was elected to the House of Representatives in 1799, the family moved to Philadelphia, which was the capital of the United States at the time. Besides Philadelphia, they also spent time in Richmond, Virginia, to see William's family. It was here that Anna had their third child in 1800. They moved to Vincennes, Indiana, later that year when William was appointed territorial governor of Indiana. After four years in Vincennes, William built Grouseland, a brick house for the Harrisons that also served as a popular location for the territory's social events. Attacks on families by Native American soldiers sometimes occurred in the region, and the children were regularly forced to hide inside the home, which was built to be readily defensible. A Methodist minister lived with the Harrisons in Grouseland, and he guarded the house during attacks. While living in Vincennes, Anna sought whatever newspapers and journals she could, reading about various political topics. She felt lonely in Vincennes because of the distance from her extended family; the opportunity to meet visiting national figures provided little consolation. She had five more children during her time in Indiana.

Anna took her children to live with her father during the War of 1812, as William was again serving in the military. At this time she joined the First Presbyterian Church, and she had her ninth child. At the end of the war, the Harrisons moved their log cabin, the Bend, onto property in North Bend, which Anna had inherited from her father after his death in 1814. William had retired a war hero, attracting numerous guests to their home, including their church congregation, who were invited to dinner after services each Sunday morning. Their tenth and final child was born in 1814, but he died in 1817. This was the first of several early deaths among their children: a daughter Lucy died in 1826, and their son William died in 1830, followed by the deaths of three more sons in 1838, 1839, and 1840.

Anna spent much of the 1810s and 1820s alone, as William had a successful political career that took him to the United States Congress, the Ohio Senate, and the diplomatic mission to Colombia. She educated their children, eventually founding a school in North Bend. Religious education was handled by a circuit rider. The Harrisons were not efficient with their budget, and their finances were further stressed by weddings and college tuition as their children grew. Another complication was that their son William had accumulated $12,000 (equivalent to $362,813 in 2025) in debt, which they assumed when he died.

Anna was hesitant when her husband expressed an ambition to be president of the United States, and she was upset by his presidential runs in the 1836 and 1840 presidential elections. Despite her objections, she assisted in his campaigns, hosting as prospective supporters visited their home in North Bend. Her political knowledge was valuable during the campaigns, as she was able to converse with visiting politicians. Given her observance of the Sabbath, she convinced William to skip campaigning on Sundays. Her participation continued until the death of another of her sons in 1840.

== First Lady of the United States ==
Harrison was displeased when her husband was elected president. She is quoted as saying "I wish that my husband's friends had left him where he is, happy and contented in retirement." At the age of 65, she was the oldest woman to that point to become first lady. In anticipation of her new position, she worried that she would be poorly received in Washington society and would be unable to fulfill the traditional responsibilities of a first lady. William was inaugurated as president in 1841, but Anna did not accompany him to Washington; she was feeling unwell, and the journey would involve harsh weather. She instead sent Jane Irwin Harrison, the widow of their late son, to serve as acting first lady. She prepared to join her husband the following May, but before she left, she received news that he had died of pneumonia. She chose not to make the journey, forgoing his state funeral.

== Later life and death ==
Harrison returned to North Bend after her husband's death. Though Harrison did not like her husband's successor, President John Tyler, she lobbied him to give political appointments to members of her family, leveraging her status as a former first lady. She likewise lobbied the following president, James K. Polk, to give military commissions to her grandsons. Harrison was granted a pension by the federal government in June 1841, which she spent paying her late husband's debts. Harrison became more involved in politics and religion in her later years. During the Civil War, she was a supporter of abolitionism, and she encouraged her grandsons to serve in the Union Army. In 1855, Harrison's cabin was destroyed in a fire, and she spent her final years living with her son John. Harrison died on February 25, 1864, at the age of 88. She was buried beside her husband in North Bend. Her funeral sermon was preached by Horace Bushnell.

== Legacy ==
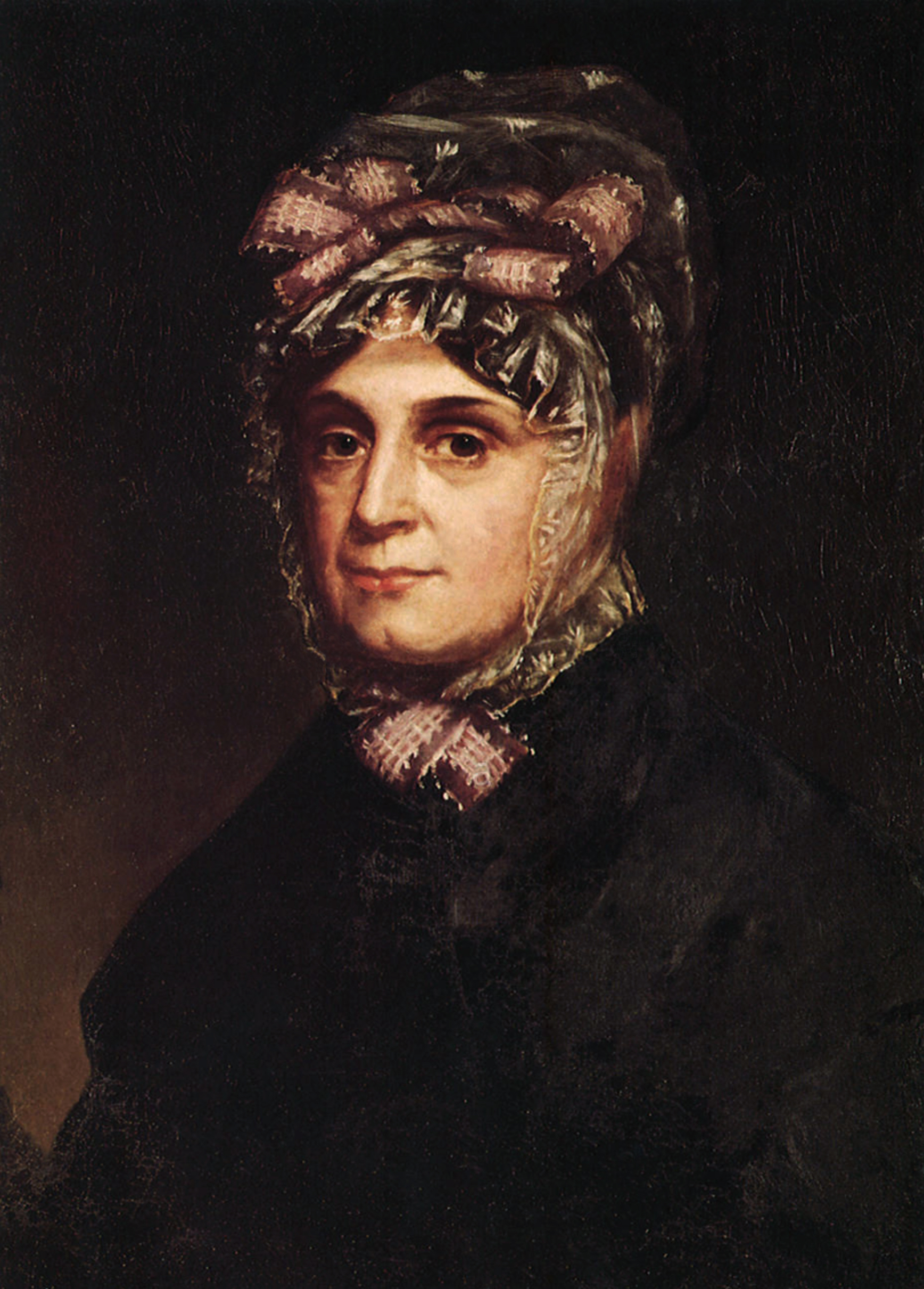
Portrait of Harrison

Harrison was the first woman widowed while first lady, and was followed by a long series of wives of presidents unwilling or unable to carry out the duties associated with the role. She did not develop a significant reputation as first lady, as her husband died before she arrived at the White House. Furthermore, her personal papers were destroyed by fire with her log cabin. For these reasons, Harrison and her performance as first lady have not been the subject of significant scholarly analysis or debate. Her historical image is primarily characterized by her devotion to religion and to family.

One subject of debate among historians is how much influence Harrison had over her husband; earlier presidential historians such as Laura Carter Holloway and Freeman Cleaves argued that she had a strong command over her husband and his career, but more recent historians have contested this. One historian, Paul Boller, compared Harrison to Rachel Jackson: as both were wives of men that were often away on military and political duties, both wished for their husbands to retire from public life, and both used their Presbyterianism to cope with these struggles.

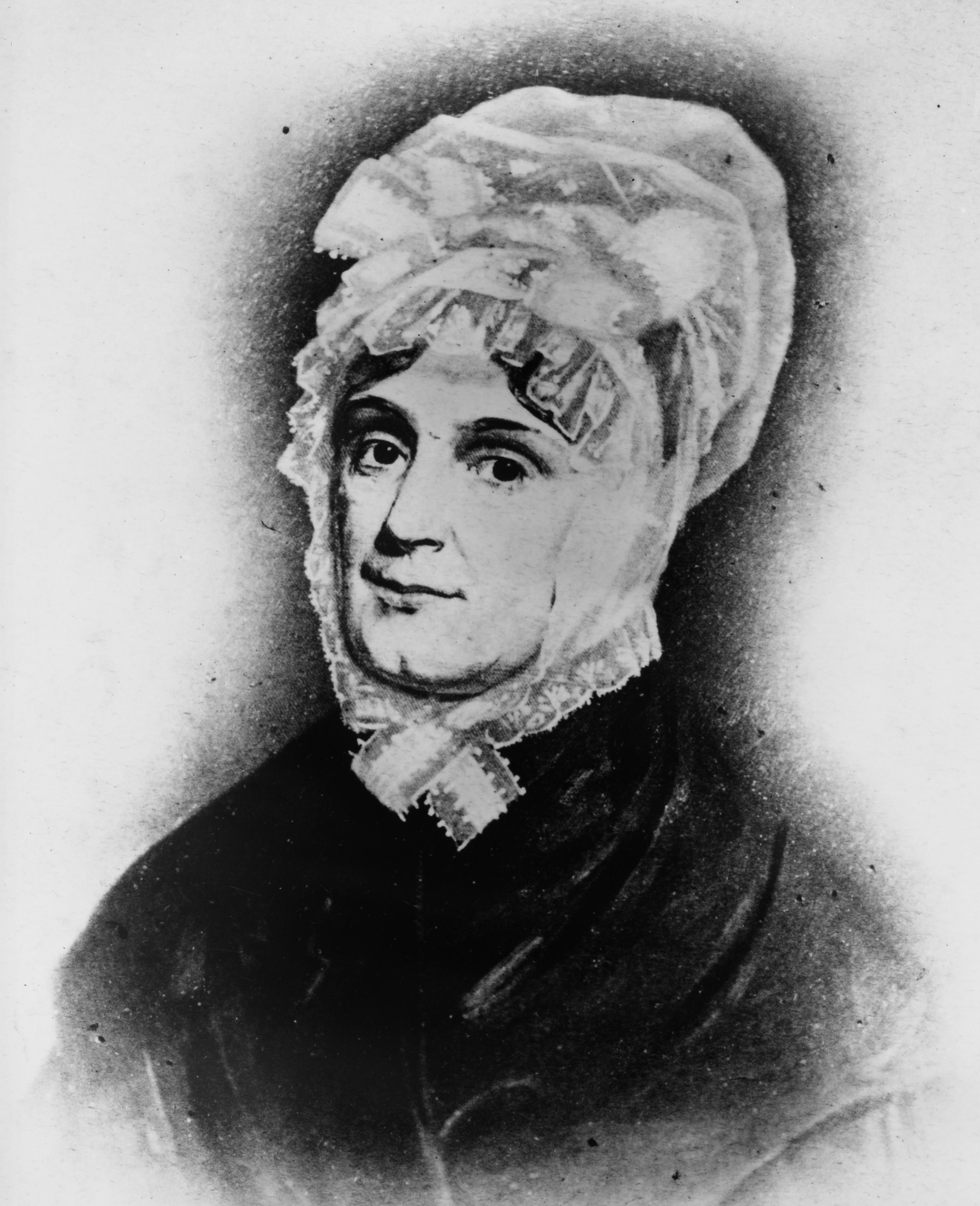
Watercolor made between 1810 and 1870 of Harrison

Harrison held several distinctions as first lady. She was the last first lady to be born before the inauguration of George Washington, and the first to receive a formal education. She was the oldest woman to become first lady at the time, doing so at the age of 65. She held this record until 2021, when Jill Biden became first lady at the age of 69. She also holds records due to her husband's short term: she served the shortest tenure of any first lady, only holding the title for 31 days, and she is the only first lady to have never been to the capital during her husband's presidency. Harrison's grandson, Benjamin Harrison, became president of the United States in 1889, effectively making her the only woman to be both the wife of one U.S. president and the grandmother of another.

In the 1982 Siena College Research Institute survey asking historians to assess American first ladies; Harrison was included. The first ladies survey, which has been conducted periodically since, ranks first ladies according to a cumulative score on the independent criteria of their background, value to the country, intelligence, courage, accomplishments, integrity, leadership, being their own women, public image, and value to the president. In the 1982 survey, out of 42 first ladies and acting first ladies, Harrison was assessed as the 23rd-highest regarded among historians. Due to the brevity of her time as first lady, Harrison has been excluded from subsequent iterations of the survey.

== See also ==
- Bibliography of United States presidential spouses and first ladies

== Notes ==
Honorary titles
Preceded by Angelica Van Buren; Acting	First Lady of the United States; 1841; Served alongside: Jane Harrison (acting)	Succeeded by Letitia Tyler
