= Jane Irwin Harrison =

First Lady of the United States in 1841

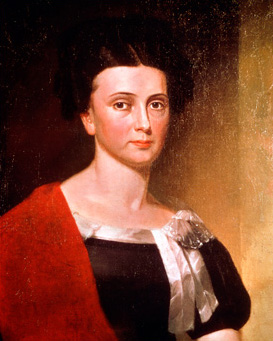

First Lady of the United States
- Acting; March 4, 1841 – April 4, 1841 Serving with Anna Harrison
- President: William Henry Harrison
- Preceded by: Angelica Singleton Van Buren
- Succeeded by: Letitia Christian Tyler

Personal details
- Born: Jane Findlay Irwin; July 23, 1804 Mercersburg, Pennsylvania, U.S.
- Died: May 11, 1847 (aged 42) Cincinnati, Ohio, U.S.
- Spouses: William Henry Harrison Jr. (m. 1821; died 1838) Lewis Whiteman (m. 1842)
- Children: 2

Jane Findlay Harrison (née Irwin; July 23, 1804 – May 11, 1847) was the acting first lady of the United States from March 4 to April 4, 1841, during the presidency of her father-in-law William Henry Harrison. She was the widow of his son William Henry Harrison Jr. and took the position as a substitute for the president's wife, Anna Harrison, who was unable to travel to the White House before his death. Harrison was only acting first lady for thirty days, as the president died in office after this time. Her sister Elizabeth was the wife of William Jr.'s brother John Scott Harrison and mother of President Benjamin Harrison.

== Early life ==
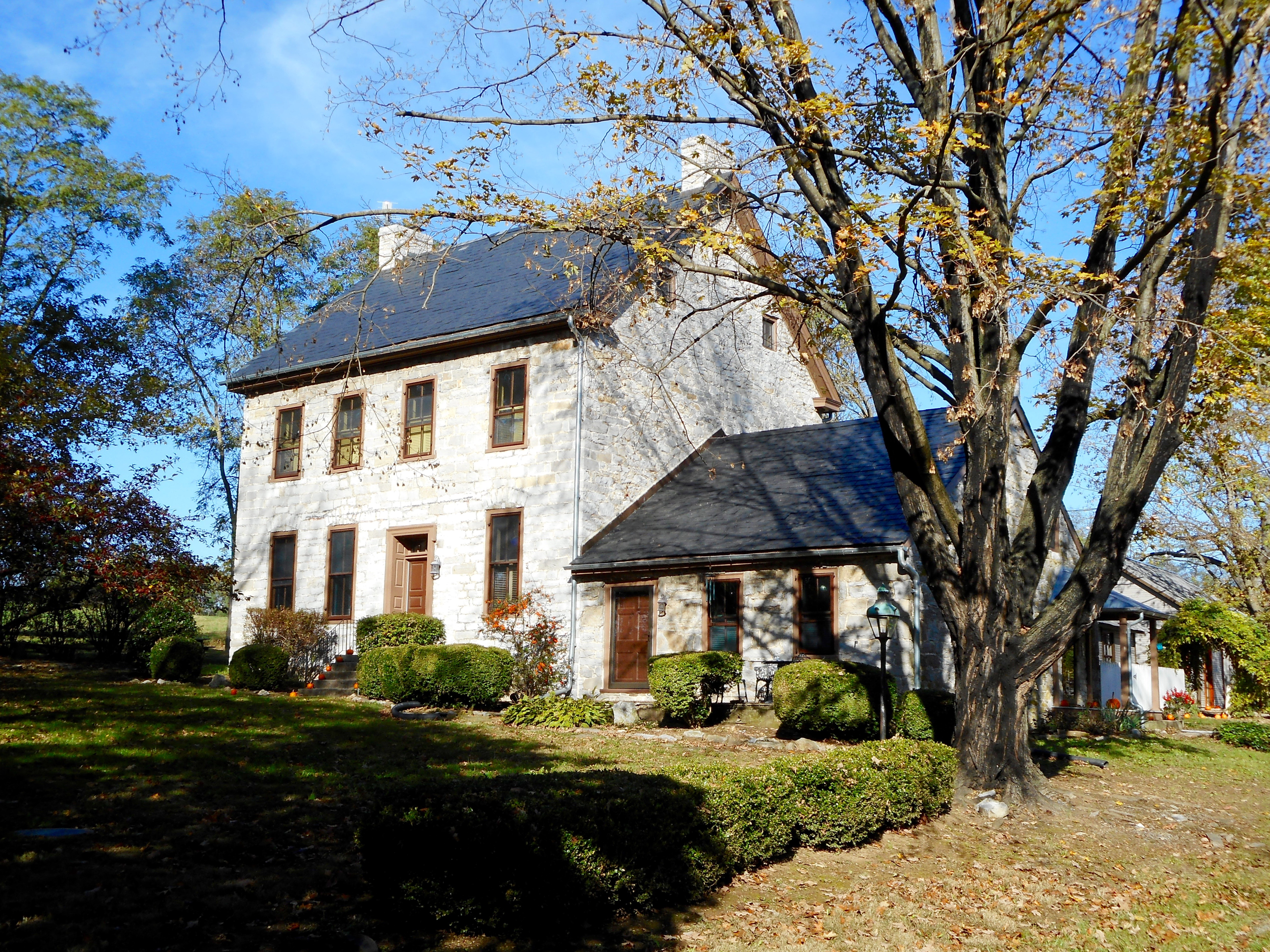
Birthplace of Jane Irwin Harrison in Irwinton Mills, near Mercersburg, Pennsylvania.

Jane Irwin was born in her family's limestone mansion in Mercersburg, Pennsylvania, on July 23, 1804. She was a granddaughter of James Ramsey, the owner of Millmont Farm in Montgomery Township, Franklin County, Pennsylvania. Her father was Archibald Irwin Jr, a miller, and her mother was Mary Ramsey Irwin, the daughter of a miller. She had a sister, Elizabeth, and three brothers: James, John, and Archibald. Her father later married Sidney Grubb. From this marriage, Jane received seven half-siblings: Joseph, William, Mary, Nancy, Louisa, Sarah, and Sydney.

While Irwin and her sister were visiting their aunt in North Bend, Ohio, they met the Harrison family. Irwin married William Henry Harrison Jr on February 18, 1824. Jane Harrison had two sons: James and William. The marriage was a difficult one, as her husband suffered from alcoholism and severe problem gambling. Her husband died in 1838. In 1840, her father-in-law was elected president of the United States.

== White House hostess ==
When William Henry Harrison became president, Anna Harrison did not travel to Washington, D.C., instead waiting until the weather was more suitable for travel given her poor health. William Henry Harrison appointed Jane Harrison as the White House hostess, the traditional role of the first lady of the United States, in her stead. She made the journey to Washington with the president-elect. Accompanying them was her paternal aunt Jane Findlay. Jane Harrison had asked her aunt to join them as a social adviser, as Findlay had previously lived in Washington, D.C as the wife of a congressman.

The Harrisons originally intended to have Anna arrive in Washington the following spring to serve as first lady, at which point Jane would possibly be relegated to a role of an assistant hostess. This never came to be, as Harrison's tenure as acting first lady ended abruptly upon the death of President Harrison, only thirty days after his inauguration. Due to the short nature of her father-in-law's tenure as president, she hosted only two social events.

== Death and legacy ==
After returning to North Bend, Harrison married widower Lewis Whiteman. She died of tuberculosis a few years later. According to her grave marker, she died on May 11, 1847. (Note: Sources have variously described her year of death as 1845, 1846, or 1847.)

It was common for younger women to act as surrogate first ladies during this period in American history, and Harrison was one of many such women to serve as White House hostess in the stead of the president's wife. Carl Sferrazza Anthony described Harrison as the least influential of all acting U.S. first ladies due to the short duration of her tenure. Many of the details of her tenure have been lost, as she left no written record of her experiences as first lady. Her aunt, Jane Findlay, has sometimes been erroneously credited as the acting first lady, as she had assisted Jane Irwin Harrison at the White House.

Harrison's sister Elizabeth Ramsey Irwin married William Henry Harrison's son John Scott Harrison in 1831, and their son Benjamin Harrison later became president of the United States. As Benjamin was a son of her sister and her brother-in-law, Harrison became both the maternal aunt and the paternal aunt-by-marriage of a future president.

== See also ==
- Bibliography of United States presidential spouses and first ladies

== Notes ==
Honorary titles
Preceded by Angelica Van Buren	First Lady of the United States; Acting; 1841; Served alongside: Anna Harrison	Succeeded by Letitia Tyler
