= Harrison Memorial =

Harrison Memorial may refer to the following:

== Awards ==
- Edward Harrison Memorial Prize
- Harrison-Meldola Memorial Prizes

== Buildings and structures ==
- Benjamin Harrison Memorial Bridge near Hopewell, Virginia
- William Henry Harrison Tomb State Memorial near North Bend, Ohio
