= William Henry Harrison =

President of the United States in 1841

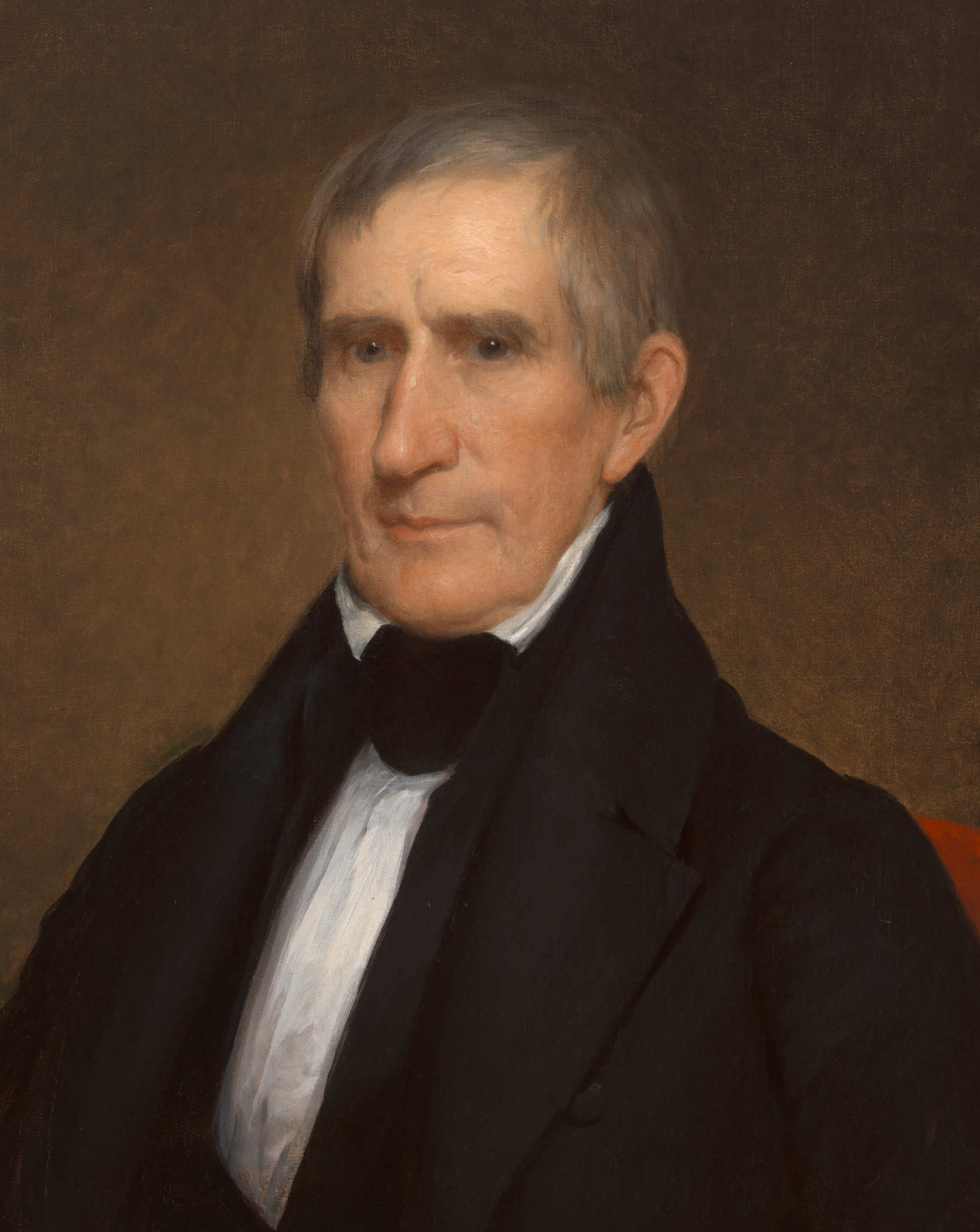
- Portrait, c. 1840

9th President of the United States
- In office March 4 – April 4, 1841
- Vice President: John Tyler
- Preceded by: Martin Van Buren
- Succeeded by: John Tyler

United States Minister to Gran Colombia
- In office February 5 – September 26, 1829
- President: John Quincy Adams; Andrew Jackson
- Preceded by: Beaufort Taylor Watts
- Succeeded by: Thomas Patrick Moore

United States Senator from Ohio
- In office March 4, 1825 – May 20, 1828
- Preceded by: Ethan Allen Brown
- Succeeded by: Jacob Burnet

Member of the Ohio Senate from the Hamilton County district
- In office December 5, 1819 – December 2, 1821
- Preceded by: Ephraim Brown
- Succeeded by: Ephraim Brown

Member of the U.S. House of Representatives from Ohio's 1st district
- In office October 8, 1816 – March 3, 1819
- Preceded by: John McLean
- Succeeded by: Thomas R. Ross

1st Governor of the Indiana Territory
- In office January 10, 1801 – December 28, 1812
- Appointed by: John Adams
- Preceded by: Office established
- Succeeded by: Thomas Posey

Delegate to the U.S. House of Representatives from the Northwest Territory's at-large district
- In office October 3, 1799 – May 14, 1800
- Preceded by: Constituency established
- Succeeded by: William McMillan

2nd Secretary of the Northwest Territory
- In office June 28, 1798 – October 1, 1799
- Governor: Arthur St. Clair
- Preceded by: Winthrop Sargent
- Succeeded by: Charles Willing Byrd

Personal details
- Born: February 9, 1773 Berkeley Plantation, Charles City County, Virginia, British America
- Died: April 4, 1841 (aged 68) White House, Washington, D.C., U.S.
- Cause of death: Enteric fever
- Resting place: Harrison Tomb State Memorial
- Party: Democratic-Republican (before 1828); Whig (from 1836)
- Spouse: Anna Symmes (m. 1795)
- Children: 10 with Anna, including John, 2 alleged with Dilsia, including Marie Harrison
- Parent: Benjamin Harrison V (father)
- Relatives: Harrison family of Virginia
- Education: Hampden–Sydney College; University of Pennsylvania
- Occupation: Soldier; politician
- Awards: Congressional Gold Medal; Thanks of Congress

Military service
- Branch/service: United States Army; Indiana Territory militia
- Years of service: 1791–1798; 1811; 1812–1814
- Rank: Major general
- Unit: Legion of the United States
- Commands: Army of the Northwest
- Battles/wars: Northwest Indian War; Siege of Fort Recovery; Battle of Fallen Timbers; Tecumseh's War; Battle of Tippecanoe; War of 1812; Siege of Fort Wayne; Battle of the Thames

William Henry Harrison (February 9, 1773 – April 4, 1841) was the ninth president of the United States, serving from March 1841 until his death 31 days later in April. He was the shortest serving president and the first one to die in office. His death triggered a brief constitutional crisis regarding presidential succession which ended when John Tyler, Harrison's vice president, assumed the office.

Harrison was born in Charles City County, Virginia. He was the last president to be born before the U.S. Declaration of Independence, making him a British subject. A member of the Harrison family of Virginia, he was a son of Benjamin Harrison V, a Founding Father, and the father of John Scott Harrison, the only son and father of two presidents of the United States. His grandson, Benjamin Harrison, became the 23rd president of the United States. In 1794, he participated in the Battle of Fallen Timbers, an American military victory that ended the Northwest Indian War. In 1811, he led a military force against Tecumseh's confederacy at the Battle of Tippecanoe, for which he earned the nickname "Old Tippecanoe". He was promoted to major general in the Army during the War of 1812, and led American infantry and cavalry to victory at the Battle of the Thames in Upper Canada.

Harrison's political career began in 1798, with an appointment as secretary of the Northwest Territory. In 1799, he was elected as the territory's non-voting delegate in the U.S. House of Representatives. He became governor of the newly established Indiana Territory in 1801 and, through multiple treaties with American Indian tribes, he acquired millions of acres for the nation. After the War of 1812, he moved to Ohio where, in 1816, he was elected to represent the state's 1st district in the House. In 1824, he was elected to the U.S. Senate, though his Senate term was cut short by his appointment as minister plenipotentiary to Gran Colombia in 1828.

Harrison returned to private life in Ohio until he was one of four Whig Party nominees in the 1836 U.S. presidential election, which he lost to Democrat Martin Van Buren. In the 1840 presidential election, the party nominated him again, with John Tyler as his running mate, under the campaign slogan "Tippecanoe and Tyler Too", and Harrison defeated Van Buren. Just three weeks after his inauguration, Harrison fell ill and died days later. After resolution of an ambiguity in the constitution regarding succession, Tyler became president. While he had no opportunity to make a name for his actions as a president (though his few days included actions that went against the then-common spoils system), Harrison is remembered for actions in his earlier career, including his Indian treaties, and for his inventive election campaign tactics. He is typically ranked in the bottom quartile of historical presidential rankings due to the brevity of his tenure, though for the same reason he, as well as James A. Garfield, are often omitted from them altogether.

== Early life and education ==
William Henry Harrison was the seventh and youngest child of Benjamin Harrison V and Elizabeth (Bassett) Harrison. Born on February 9, 1773, at Berkeley Plantation, the home of the Harrison family of Virginia on the James River in Charles City County, he became the last United States president not born as an American citizen. The Harrisons were a prominent political family of English descent whose ancestors had been in Virginia since the 1630s. His father was a Virginia planter, who served as a delegate to the Continental Congress and who signed the Declaration of Independence. His father also served in the Virginia legislature and as the fifth governor of Virginia (1781–1784) in the years during and after the American Revolutionary War. Harrison's older brother Carter Bassett Harrison represented Virginia in the House of Representatives (1793–1799). William Henry often referred to himself as a "child of the revolution", as indeed he was, having grown up in a home just 30 mi (48 km) from where Washington won the war against the British in the Battle of Yorktown.

Harrison was tutored at home until age 14 when he attended Hampden–Sydney College, a Presbyterian college in Hampden Sydney, Virginia. He studied there for three years, receiving a classical education that included Latin, Greek, French, logic, and debate. His Episcopalian father removed him from the college, possibly for religious reasons, and after brief stays at an academy in Southampton County, Virginia, and with his elder brother Benjamin Harrison VI in Richmond, he went to Philadelphia in 1790.

His father died in the spring of 1791, and he was placed in the care of Robert Morris, a close family friend in Philadelphia. He studied medicine at the University of Pennsylvania. While at Penn, he studied with Benjamin Rush, a Founding Father of the United States, a Penn professor of chemistry and medicine, and a doctor, and William Shippen Sr. William Harrison's older brother inherited their father's money, so William lacked the funds for his further medical schooling, which he had also discovered he did not prefer. He withdrew from Penn, although school archives record him as a "non-graduate alumnus of Penn's medical school class of 1793". With the influence of his father's friend, Governor Henry Lee III, he embarked upon a military career.

=== Early military career ===
On August 16, 1791, within 24 hours of meeting Lee, William Harrison, age 18, was commissioned as an ensign in the United States Army and assigned to the First American Regiment. He was initially assigned to Fort Washington, Cincinnati in the Northwest Territory where the army was engaged in the ongoing Northwest Indian War. Biographer William W. Freehling says that young Harrison, in his first military act, rounded up about eighty thrill-seekers and troublemakers off Philadelphia's streets, talked them into signing enlistment papers, and marched them to Fort Washington.

Harrison was promoted to lieutenant after Major General "Mad Anthony" Wayne took command of the western army in 1792, after a disastrous defeat under Arthur St. Clair. In 1793, he became Wayne's aide-de-camp and acquired the skills to command an army on the frontier; he participated in Wayne's decisive victory at the Battle of Fallen Timbers on August 20, 1794, which ended the Northwest Indian War. He received the following commendation from Wayne for his role in the battle: "I must add the name of my faithful and gallant Aide-de-camp ... Lieutenant Harrison, who ... rendered the most essential service by communicating my orders in every direction ... conduct and bravery exciting the troops to press for victory." Harrison was a signatory of the Treaty of Greenville (1795), as witness to Wayne, the principal negotiator for the U.S. Under the terms of the treaty, a coalition of Indians ceded a portion of their lands to the federal government, opening two-thirds of Ohio to settlement.

At his mother's death in 1793, Harrison inherited a portion of his family's Virginia estate, including approximately 3,000 acres (12 km^{2}) of land and some slaves. He was serving in the Army at the time and sold the land to his brother. Harrison was promoted to captain in May 1797 and resigned from the Army on June 1, 1798.

=== Marriage and family ===
Harrison met Anna Tuthill Symmes of North Bend, Ohio in 1795 when he was 22. She was a daughter of Anna Tuthill and Judge John Cleves Symmes, who served as a colonel in the Revolutionary War and as a representative to the Congress of the Confederation. Harrison asked the judge for permission to marry Anna but was refused, so the couple waited until Symmes left on business. They then eloped and were married on November 25, 1795, at the North Bend home of Stephen Wood, treasurer of the Northwest Territory. They honeymooned at Fort Washington, since Harrison was still on military duty.

Judge Symmes confronted him two weeks later at a farewell dinner for General Wayne, sternly demanding to know how he intended to support a family. Harrison responded, "by my sword, and my own right arm, sir". The match was advantageous for Harrison, as he eventually exploited his father-in-law's connections with land speculators, which facilitated his departure from the army. Judge Symmes' doubts about him persisted, as he wrote to a friend, "He can neither bleed, plead, nor preach, and if he could plow I should be satisfied." Matters eventually became cordial with the father-in-law, who later sold the Harrisons 160 acres (65 ha) of land in North Bend, which enabled Harrison to build a home and start a farm. Anna was frequently in poor health during their marriage, primarily because of her many pregnancies, yet she outlived William by 23 years, dying on February 25, 1864, at 88. The Harrisons had ten children:

- Elizabeth Bassett (1796–1846)
- John Cleves Symmes (1798–1830), who married the only surviving daughter of Zebulon Pike
- Lucy Singleton (1800–1826)
- William Henry Jr. (1802–1838)
- John Scott (1804–1878), father of future U.S. president Benjamin Harrison
- Benjamin (1806–1840)
- Mary Symmes (1809–1842)
- Carter Bassett (1811–1839)
- Anna Tuthill (1813–1865)
- James Findlay (1814–1817)

Professor Kenneth R. Janken, in his biography of Walter Francis White, claims that Harrison had six children by an enslaved African-American woman named Dilsia and, before running for president, gave four of them to a brother to avoid scandal. The assertion is based on the White family's oral history. In her 2012 biography of Harrison, author Gail Collins describes this as an unlikely story, although White believed it to be true.

== Political career ==
Harrison began his political career when he temporarily resigned from the military on June 1, 1798, and campaigned among his friends and family for a post in the Northwest Territorial government. His close friend Timothy Pickering was serving as Secretary of State, and along with Judge Symmes's influence, he was recommended to replace Winthrop Sargent, the outgoing territorial secretary. President John Adams appointed Harrison to the position in July 1798. The work of recording the activities of the territory was tedious, and he soon became bored, and sought a position in the U.S. Congress.

=== U.S. Congress ===
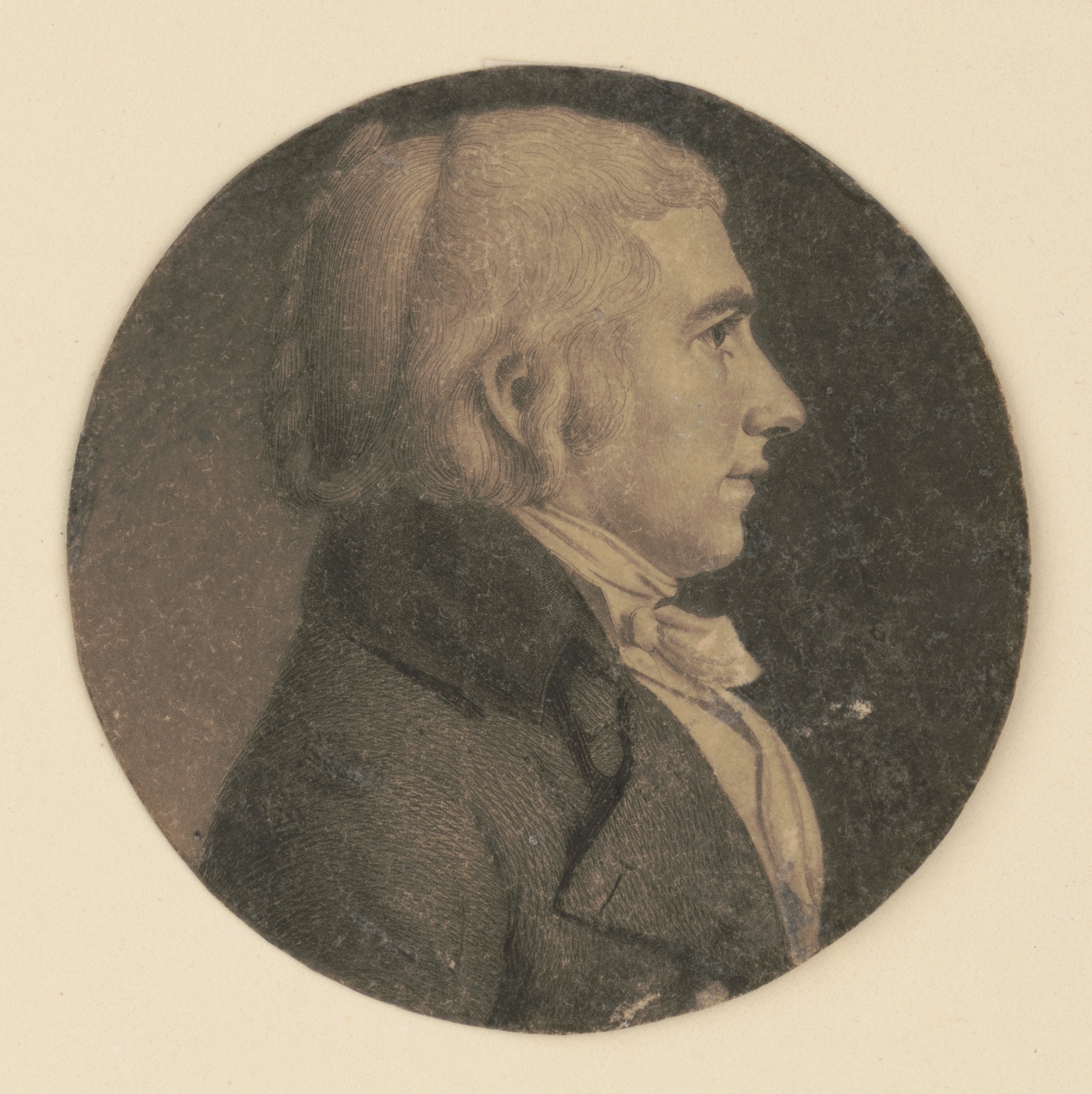
An engraved portrait print of Harrison at age 27, as a delegate member of the U.S. House of Representatives from the Northwest Territory, by Charles Balthazar Julien Févret de Saint-Mémin, c. 1800

Harrison had many friends in the Eastern aristocracy and quickly gained a reputation among them as a frontier leader. He ran a successful horse-breeding enterprise that won him acclaim throughout the Northwest Territory. Congress had legislated a territorial policy that led to high land costs, a primary concern for settlers in the Territory; Harrison became their champion to lower those prices. The Northwest Territory's population reached a sufficient number to have a congressional delegate in October 1799, and Harrison ran for election. He campaigned to encourage further migration to the territory, which eventually led to statehood.

Harrison defeated Arthur St. Clair Jr. to become the Northwest Territory's first congressional delegate in 1798 at age 26, and served in the Sixth United States Congress from March 4, 1799, to May 14, 1800. He had no authority to vote on legislative bills, but he was permitted to serve on a committee, to submit legislation, and to engage in debate. He became chairman of the Committee on Public Lands and promoted the Land Act of 1800, which made it easier to buy Northwest Territory land in smaller tracts at a lower cost. Freeholders were permitted to buy smaller lots with a down payment of only five percent, and this became an important factor in the Territory's rapid population growth.

Harrison was also instrumental in arranging the division of the Territory into two sections. The eastern section continued to be known as the Northwest Territory and included present-day Ohio and eastern Michigan; the western section was named the Indiana Territory and included present-day Indiana, Illinois, Wisconsin, a portion of western Michigan, and an eastern portion of Minnesota. The two new territories were formally established by law in 1800.

On May 13, 1800, President John Adams appointed Harrison as the governor of the Indiana Territory, based on his ties to the west and his apparent neutral political stances. He served in this capacity for twelve years. His governorship was confirmed by the Senate and he resigned from Congress to become the first Indiana territorial governor in 1801.

=== Indiana territorial governor ===
Harrison began his duties on January 10, 1801, at Vincennes, the capital of the Indiana Territory. Presidents Thomas Jefferson and James Madison were members of the Democratic-Republican Party, and they reappointed him as governor in 1803, 1806, and 1809. In 1804, Harrison was assigned to administer the civilian government of the District of Louisiana. He conducted the district's affairs for five weeks until the Louisiana Territory was formally established on July 4, 1805, and Brigadier General James Wilkinson assumed the duties of governor.

In 1805, Harrison built a plantation-style home near Vincennes that he named Grouseland, in tribute to the birds on the property. The 26-room home was one of the first brick structures in the territory; and it served as a center of social and political life in the territory during his tenure as governor. Harrison founded a university at Vincennes in 1801, which was incorporated as Vincennes University on November 29, 1806. The territorial capital was eventually moved to Corydon in 1813, and Harrison built a second home at nearby Harrison Valley.

Harrison's primary responsibility was to obtain title to Indian lands that would allow future settlement and increase the territory's population, a requirement for statehood. He was also eager to expand the territory for personal reasons, as his political fortunes were tied to Indiana's eventual statehood. While benefiting from land speculation on his own behalf, and acquiring two milling operations, he was credited as a good administrator, with significant improvements in roads and other infrastructure.

When Harrison was reappointed as the Indiana territorial governor on February 8, 1803, he was given expanded authority to negotiate and conclude treaties with the Indians. The 1804 Treaty of St. Louis with Quashquame required the Sauk and Meskwaki tribes to cede much of western Illinois and parts of Missouri. Many of the Sauk resented the loss of lands, especially their leader Black Hawk. Harrison thought that the Treaty of Grouseland (1805) appeased some of the Indians, but tensions remained high along the frontier. The Treaty of Fort Wayne (1809) raised new tensions when Harrison purchased more than 2.5 million acres (10,000 km^{2}) from the Potawatomi, Delaware, Miami, and Eel River tribes. Some Indians disputed the authority of the tribes joining in the treaty. Harrison was also able to conduct matters unquestioned by the government, as the administration changed hands from Jefferson to Madison.

He pursued the treaty process aggressively by offering large subsidies to the tribes and their leaders, so as to gain political favor with Jefferson before his departure. Biographer Freehling asserts that the Indians perceived the ownership of land was as common to all, just as the air that is breathed. In 1805, Harrison succeeded in acquiring for the nation as many as 51,000,000 acres from the Indians, after plying five of their chiefs with alcohol, for no more than a dollar per 20,000 acres ($21.50 in 2025), and comprising two-thirds of Illinois and sizable chunks of Wisconsin and Missouri.

In addition to resulting tensions with the Indians, Harrison's pro-slavery position made him unpopular with the Indiana Territory's abolitionists, as he tried in vain to encourage slavery in the territory. In 1803, he had lobbied Congress to temporarily suspend for ten years Article VI of the Northwest Ordinance prohibiting slavery in the Indiana Territory. Though Harrison asserted that the suspension was necessary to promote settlement and make the territory economically viable and ready for statehood, the proposal failed. Lacking the suspension of Article VI, in 1807 the territorial legislature, with Harrison's support, enacted laws that authorized indentured servitude and gave masters authority to determine the length of service.

President Jefferson, primary author of the Northwest Ordinance, made a secret compact with James Lemen to defeat the nascent pro-slavery movement supported by Harrison. He donated $100 to encourage Lemen with abolition and other good works, and later (in 1808) another $20 ($403.10 in 2025) to help fund the church known as Bethel Baptist Church. In Indiana, the planting of the anti-slavery church led to citizens signing a petition and organizing politically to defeat Harrison's efforts to legalize slavery in the territory.

The Indiana Territory held elections to the legislature's upper and lower houses for the first time in 1809. Harrison found himself at odds with the legislature after the abolitionists came to power, and the eastern portion of the Indiana Territory grew to include a large anti-slavery population. The Territory's general assembly convened in 1810, and its anti-slavery faction immediately repealed the indenturing laws previously enacted. After 1809, the Indiana legislature assumed more authority and the territory advanced toward statehood.

== Army general ==
=== Tecumseh and Tippecanoe ===
Indian resistance to American expansion came to a head, with the leadership of Shawnee brothers Tecumseh and Tenskwatawa ("The Prophet"), in a conflict that became known as Tecumseh's War. Tenskwatawa convinced the tribes that they would be protected by the Great Spirit and that no harm could befall them if they rose up against the settlers. He encouraged resistance by telling the tribes to pay white traders only half of what they owed and to give up all the white man's ways, including their clothing, muskets, and especially whiskey. Harrison received word of the resistance through spies he had placed within the tribes, and asked Madison to fund military preparations. Madison dragged his feet, and Harrison attempted to negotiate, sending a letter to Tecumseh saying, "Our Blue Coats (U.S. Army soldiers) are more numerous than you can count, and our hunting shirts (volunteer militiamen) are like the leaves of the forests or the grains of sand on the Wabash."

1915 depiction of Tecumseh, believed to be copying an 1808 sketch

In August 1810, Tecumseh led 400 warriors down the Wabash River to meet with Harrison in Vincennes. They were dressed in war paint, and their sudden appearance at first frightened the soldiers at Vincennes. The leaders of the group were escorted to Grouseland, where they met Harrison. Tecumseh berated the condescending Harrison repeatedly, and insisted that the Fort Wayne Treaty was illegitimate, arguing that one tribe could not sell land without the approval of the other tribes. He asked Harrison to nullify it and warned that Americans should not attempt to settle the lands sold in the treaty. Tecumseh informed Harrison that he had threatened to kill the chiefs who signed the treaty if they carried out its terms and that his confederation of tribes was growing rapidly. Harrison said that the individual tribes were the owners of the land and could sell it as they wished. He rejected Tecumseh's claim that all the Indians formed one nation and said that each tribe could have separate relations with the United States if they chose to do so. Harrison argued that the Great Spirit would have made all the tribes speak one language if they were to be one nation.

Tecumseh launched an "impassioned rebuttal", in the words of one historian, but Harrison was unable to understand his language. Tecumseh then began shouting at Harrison and called him a liar. A Shawnee friendly to Harrison cocked his pistol from the sidelines to alert Harrison that Tecumseh's speech was leading to trouble, and some witnesses reported that Tecumseh was encouraging the warriors to kill Harrison. Many of them began to pull their weapons, representing a substantial threat to Harrison and the town, which held a population of only 1,000. Harrison drew his sword, and Tecumseh's warriors backed down when the officers presented their firearms in his defense. Chief Winamac was friendly to Harrison, and he countered Tecumseh's arguments, telling the warriors that they should return home in peace since they had come in peace. Before leaving, Tecumseh informed Harrison that he would seek an alliance with the British if the Fort Wayne Treaty was not nullified. After the meeting, Tecumseh journeyed to meet with many of the tribes in the region, hoping to create a confederation to battle the United States.

Harrison was concerned that Tecumseh's actions would endanger the statehood of Indiana, as well as his political future, leaving it "the haunt of a few wretched savages". Tecumseh was traveling in 1811, leaving Tenskwatawa in charge of Indian forces. Harrison saw a window of opportunity in Tecumseh's absence, and advised Secretary of War William Eustis to present a show of force to the Indian confederation. Despite being 13 years removed from military action, Harrison convinced Madison and Eustis to allow him to assume command. He led an army north with 950 men to intimidate the Shawnee into making peace, but the tribes launched a surprise attack early on November 7 in the Battle of Tippecanoe. Harrison countered and defeated the tribal forces at Prophetstown next to the Wabash and Tippecanoe Rivers; the battle became famous and he was hailed as a national hero. Although his troops had suffered 62 dead and 126 wounded during the battle and the Shawnee just 150 casualties, the Shawnee prophet's vision of spiritual protection had been shattered. Tenskwatawa and his forces fled to Canada, and their campaign to unite the tribes of the region to reject assimilation failed.

When reporting to Secretary Eustis, Harrison had informed him of the battle near the Tippecanoe River and that he had anticipated an attack. A first dispatch had not been clear which side had won the conflict, and the secretary interpreted it as a defeat until the follow-up dispatch clarified the situation. When no second attack came, the Shawnee defeat had become more certain. Eustis demanded to know why Harrison had not taken adequate precautions in fortifying his camp against the initial attack, and Harrison said that he had considered the position strong enough. The dispute was the catalyst of a disagreement between Harrison and the Department of War, which continued into the War of 1812. Freehling says that Harrison's rusty skills resulted in his troops setting campfires the night before the battle, exposing their position to a surprise attack and casualties.

The press did not cover the battle at first, until one Ohio paper misinterpreted Harrison's first dispatch to mean that he was defeated. By December, however, most major American papers carried stories on the battle victory, and public outrage grew over the Shawnee. Americans blamed the British for inciting the tribes to violence and supplying them with firearms, and Congress passed resolutions condemning the British for interfering in American domestic affairs. Congress declared war on June 18, 1812, and Harrison left Vincennes to seek a military appointment.

=== War of 1812 ===
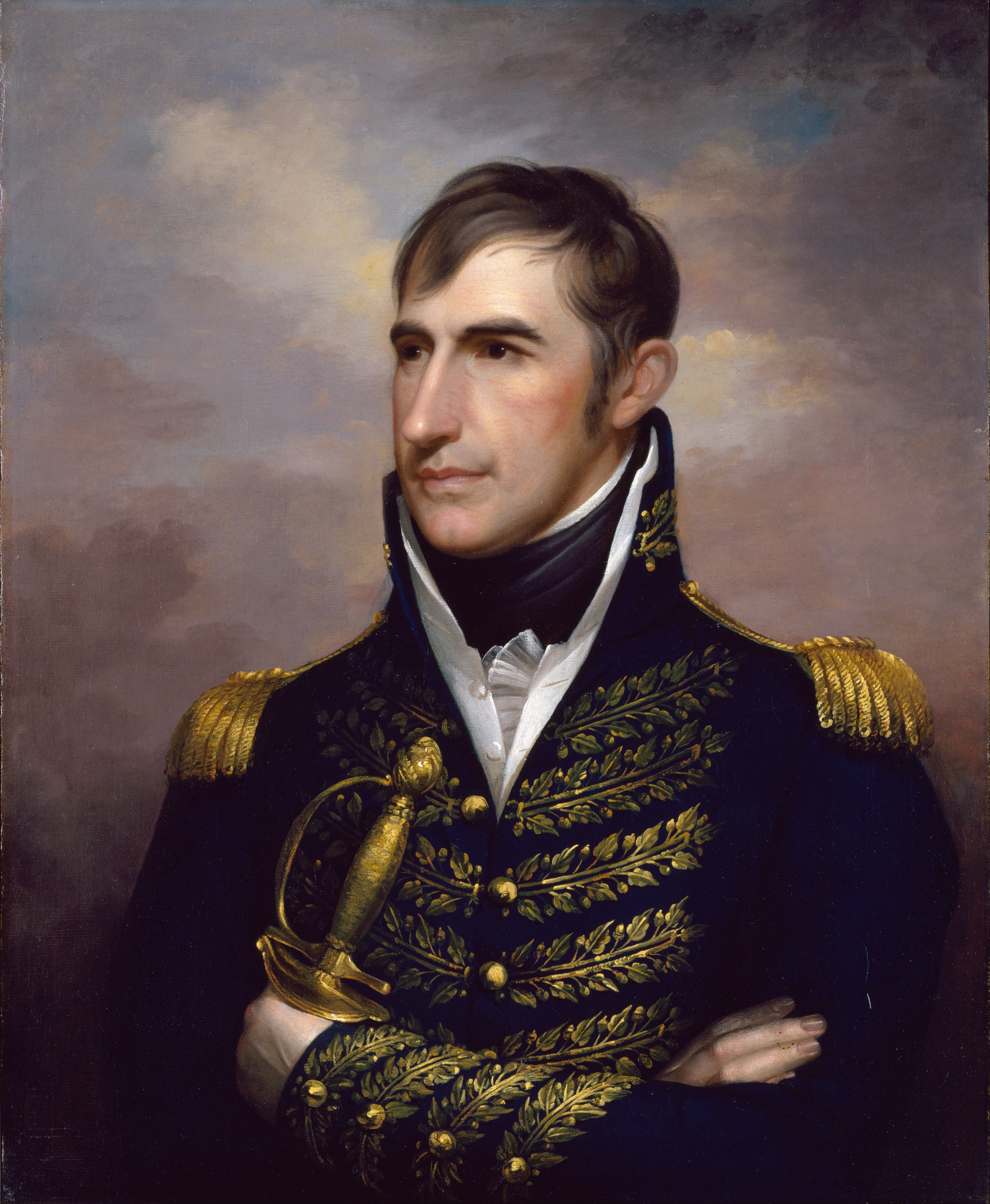
This portrait of Harrison originally showed him in civilian clothes as a congressional delegate in 1800; the uniform was added after service in the War of 1812.

The outbreak of war with the British in 1812 led to continued conflict with Indians in the Northwest. Harrison briefly served as a major general in the Kentucky militia until the government commissioned him on September 17 to command the Army of the Northwest. He received federal military pay for his service, and he also collected a territorial governor's salary from September until December 28, when he formally resigned as governor and continued his military service. Authors Gugin and St. Clair claim the resignation was forced upon him. Harrison was succeeded by John Gibson as acting governor of the territory.

The Americans suffered a defeat in the siege of Detroit. General James Winchester offered Harrison the rank of brigadier general, but Harrison wanted sole command of the army. President James Madison removed Winchester from command in September, and Harrison became commander of the fresh recruits. He received orders to retake Detroit and boost morale, but he initially held back, unwilling to press the war northward. The British and their Indian allies greatly outnumbered Harrison's troops, so Harrison constructed a defensive position during the winter along the Maumee River in northwest Ohio. He named it Fort Meigs in honor of Ohio governor Return J. Meigs Jr. He then received reinforcements in 1813, took the offensive, and led the army north to battle. He won victories in the Indiana Territory as well as Ohio and recaptured Detroit before invading Upper Canada (Ontario). His army defeated the British, and Tecumseh was killed, on October 5, 1813, at the Battle of the Thames. It was considered to be one of the great American victories in the war, second only to the Battle of New Orleans, and secured a national reputation for Harrison.

In 1814, Secretary of War John Armstrong Jr. divided the command of the army, assigning Harrison to an outlying post and giving control of the front to one of Harrison's subordinates. Armstrong and Harrison had disagreed over the lack of coordination and effectiveness in the invasion of Canada, and Harrison resigned from the army in May. After the war ended, Congress investigated Harrison's resignation and determined that Armstrong had mistreated him during his military campaign and that his resignation was justified. Congress awarded Harrison a gold medal for his services during the war.

Harrison and Michigan Territory's Governor Lewis Cass were responsible for negotiating the peace treaty with the Indians. President Madison appointed Harrison in June 1815 to help in negotiating a second treaty with the Indians that became known as the Treaty of Springwells, in which the tribes ceded a large tract of land in the west, providing additional land for American purchase and settlement.

== Postwar life ==
=== Ohio politician and diplomat ===
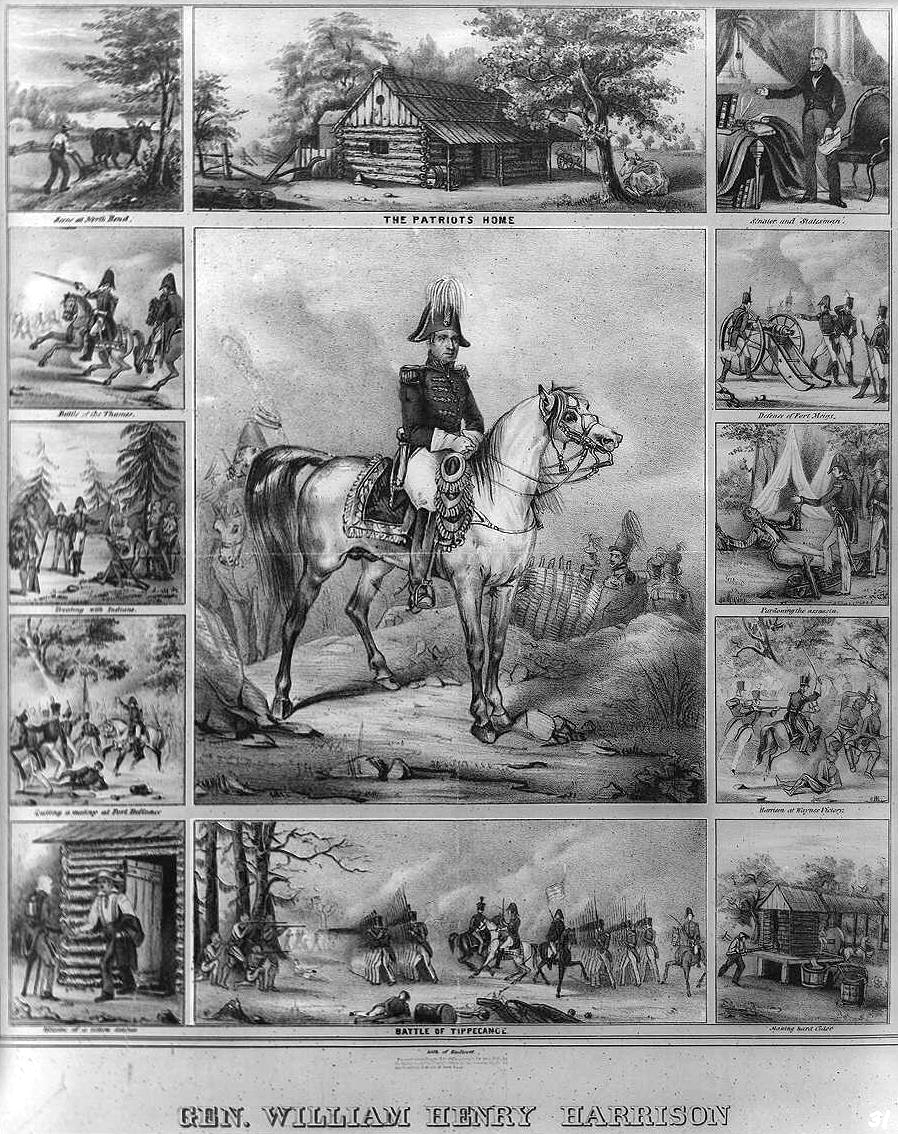
Poster lauding Harrison's accomplishments

Harrison resigned from the army in 1814, shortly before the conclusion of the War of 1812, and returned to his family and farm in North Bend, Ohio. Freehling claims that his expenses then well exceeded his means and he fell into debt, that Harrison chose "celebrity over duty", as he sought the adulation found at parties in New York, Washington, and Philadelphia, and that he became an office seeker. He was elected in 1816 to complete John McLean's term in the House of Representatives, representing Ohio's 1st congressional district until 1819. He attempted to secure the post of Secretary of War under President Monroe in 1817 but lost out to John C. Calhoun. He was also passed over for a diplomatic post to Russia. He was elected to the Ohio Senate in 1819 and served until 1821, having lost the election for Ohio governor in 1820. He ran in the 1822 election for the United States House of Representatives, but lost to James W. Gazlay. He was elected to the U.S. Senate in 1824, and was an Ohio presidential elector in 1820 for James Monroe and for Henry Clay in 1824.

Harrison was appointed in 1828 as minister plenipotentiary to Gran Colombia, so he resigned from Congress and served in his new post until March 8, 1829. He arrived in Bogotá on December 22, 1828, and found the condition of Colombia saddening. He reported to the Secretary of State that the country was on the edge of anarchy, and that Simón Bolívar was about to become a military dictator. He wrote a letter of polite rebuke to Bolívar, stating that "the strongest of all governments is that which is most free" and calling on Bolívar to encourage the development of democracy. In response, Bolívar wrote that the United States "seem destined by Providence to plague America with torments in the name of freedom", a sentiment that achieved fame in Latin America.

Freehling indicates Harrison's missteps in Colombia were "bad and frequent", that he failed to properly maintain a position of neutrality in Colombian affairs, by publicly opposing Bolivar, and that Colombia sought his removal. Andrew Jackson took office in March 1829, and recalled Harrison in order to make his own appointment to the position. Biographer James Hall claims that Harrison found in Colombia a military despotism and that "his liberal opinions, his stern republican integrity, and the plain simplicity of his dress and manners, contrasted too strongly with the arbitrary opinions and ostentatious behaviour of the public officers, to allow him to be long a favourite with those who had usurped the power of that government. They feared that the people would perceive the difference between a real and a pretended patriot, and commenced a series of persecutions against our minister, which rendered his situation extremely irksome." A very similar sentiment of the situation is related by biographer Samuel Burr.

Harrison, after leaving his post but while still in the country, wrote his roughly ten-page letter to Bolivar, which is reproduced in full in the Hall and Burr biographies. It left the former struck by Harrison's "deeply imbued principles of liberty". Burr describes the letter as "replete with wisdom, goodness, and patriotism…and the purest of principles".

=== Private citizen ===
Harrison returned to the United States and his North Bend farm, living in relative privacy after nearly four decades of government service. He had accumulated no substantial wealth during his lifetime, and he lived on his savings, a small pension, and the income produced by his farm. Burr references M. Chavalier, who encountered Harrison in Cincinnati at this time, and described Harrison as "poor, with a numerous family, abandoned by the Federal government, yet vigorous with independent thinking".

In May 1817, Harrison served as one of the founding vestry members of the Episcopal congregation, Christ Church in downtown Cincinnati (now Christ Church Cathedral). He went on to serve as a vestry member through 1819, and then again in 1824.

Local supporters had come to Harrison's relief, by appointing him Clerk of Courts for Hamilton County, where he worked from 1836 until 1840. Chevalier remarked, "His friends back east talk of making him President, while here we make him clerk of an inferior court." He also cultivated corn and established a distillery to produce whiskey, but closed it after he became disturbed by the effects of alcohol on its consumers. In an address to the Hamilton County Agricultural Board in 1831, he said that he had sinned in making whiskey and hoped that others would learn from his mistake and stop the production of liquors.

About this time, he met abolitionist and Underground Railroad conductor George DeBaptiste who lived in nearby Madison, and the two became friends. Harrison wrote at the time, "we might look forward to a day when a North American sun would not look down upon a slave." DeBaptiste became his valet, and later White House steward.

Although denied by some of Harrison's friends, Burr closes his account of Harrison by describing an event, a reception given to the general at Philadelphia in 1836, that illustrates Harrison's popularity at this time. According to Burr, "Thousands and tens of thousands crowded Chesnut street wharf upon his arrival, and greeted him with continual cheering as he landed. He stepped into the barouche but the crowd pressed forward so impetuously, that the horses became frightened and reared frequently. A rush was made to unharness the animals when the General spoke to several of them and endeavored to prevent it; but the team was soon unmanageable, and it became necessary to take them off. A rope was brought, and attached to the carriage, by which the people drew it to the Marshall House. This act was the spontaneous burst of ten thousand grateful hearts. Pennsylvanians fought under the hero, and they loved him. We speak particularly on this point, because we were eyewitnesses of all that passed."

=== 1836 presidential campaign ===
Harrison was the western Whig candidate for president in 1836, one of four Whig party candidates. The others were Daniel Webster, Hugh Lawson White, and Willie P. Mangum. More than one Whig candidate emerged in an effort to defeat the incumbent Vice President Martin Van Buren, who was the popular Jackson-chosen Democrat. The Democrats charged that, by running multiple candidates, the Whigs sought to prevent a Van Buren victory in the electoral college, and force the election into the House. If there was such a plan, then it failed. Harrison finished in second, and carried nine of the twenty-six states in the Union.

Harrison ran in all the non-slave states except Massachusetts, and in the slave states of Delaware, Maryland, and Kentucky. White ran in the remaining slave states except for South Carolina. Daniel Webster ran in Massachusetts, and Mangum in South Carolina. Van Buren won the election with 170 electoral votes. A swing of just over 4,000 votes in Pennsylvania would have given that state's 30 electoral votes to Harrison and the election would have been decided in the House of Representatives.

=== 1840 presidential campaign ===
1840 Electoral Vote Map

Harrison faced incumbent Van Buren as the sole Whig candidate in the 1840 election. The Whigs saw in Harrison a born southerner and war hero, who would contrast well with the aloof, uncaring, and aristocratic Van Buren. He was chosen over more controversial members of the party, such as Clay and Webster; his campaign highlighted his military record and focused on the weak U.S. economy caused by the Panic of 1837.

The Whigs blamed Van Buren for the economic problems and dubbed him "Van Ruin". The Democrats, in turn, ridiculed the elder Harrison by calling him "Granny Harrison, the petticoat general", because he resigned from the army before the War of 1812 ended. They noted for the voters what Harrison's name would be when spelled backwards: "No Sirrah". They cast him as a provincial, out-of-touch old man who would rather "sit in his log cabin drinking hard cider" than attend to the administration of the country. This strategy backfired when Harrison and running mate John Tyler adopted the log cabin and hard cider as campaign symbols. Their campaign used the symbols on banners and posters and created bottles of hard cider shaped like log cabins, all to connect the candidates to the "common man". Freehling wrote that, "One bitter pro-Van Buren paper lamented after his defeat, 'We have been sung down, lied down and drunk down.' In one sentence, this described the new American political process."

Harrison came from a wealthy, slaveholding Virginia family, yet his campaign promoted him as a humble frontiersman in the style popularized by Andrew Jackson, while presenting Van Buren as a wealthy elitist. A memorable example was the Gold Spoon Oration that Pennsylvania's Whig representative Charles Ogle delivered in the House, ridiculing Van Buren's elegant White House lifestyle and lavish spending. The Whigs invented a chant in which people would spit tobacco juice as they chanted "wirt-wirt", and this also exhibited the difference between candidates from the time of the election:

Old Tip he wore a homespun coat, he had no ruffled shirt: wirt-wirt,
But Matt he has the golden plate, and he's a little squirt: wirt-wirt!

The Whigs boasted of Harrison's military record and his reputation as the hero of the Battle of Tippecanoe. The campaign slogan "Tippecanoe and Tyler, Too" became one of the most famous in American politics. While Van Buren campaigned from the White House, Harrison was on the campaign trail, entertaining with his impressions of Indian war whoops, and took people's minds off the nation's economic troubles. In June 1840, a Harrison rally at the site of the Tippecanoe battle drew 60,000 people. The Village of North Bend, Ohio, as well as the alumni of Ohio State University claim that the state's use of the nickname "Buckeyes" began with Harrison's campaign message. Harrison's campaign was the victim of what is described as the nation's first "October surprise." Just days before voters went to the polls, Van Buren's Justice Department alleged that Whig Party officials had committed "the most stupendous and atrocious fraud," when they paid Pennsylvanians to travel to New York to vote for Whig candidates two years earlier.

Voter turnout shot to 80%, 20 points higher than the previous election. Harrison won a landslide victory in the Electoral College, 234 electoral votes to Van Buren's 60. The popular vote margin was much closer, at fewer than 150,000 votes, though he carried nineteen of the twenty-six states.

== Presidency (1841) ==
=== Inauguration ===
- Presidency of William Henry Harrison; March 4, 1841 – April 4, 1841
- Vice President: John Tyler
- Party: Whig
- Election: 1840
- Seat: White House
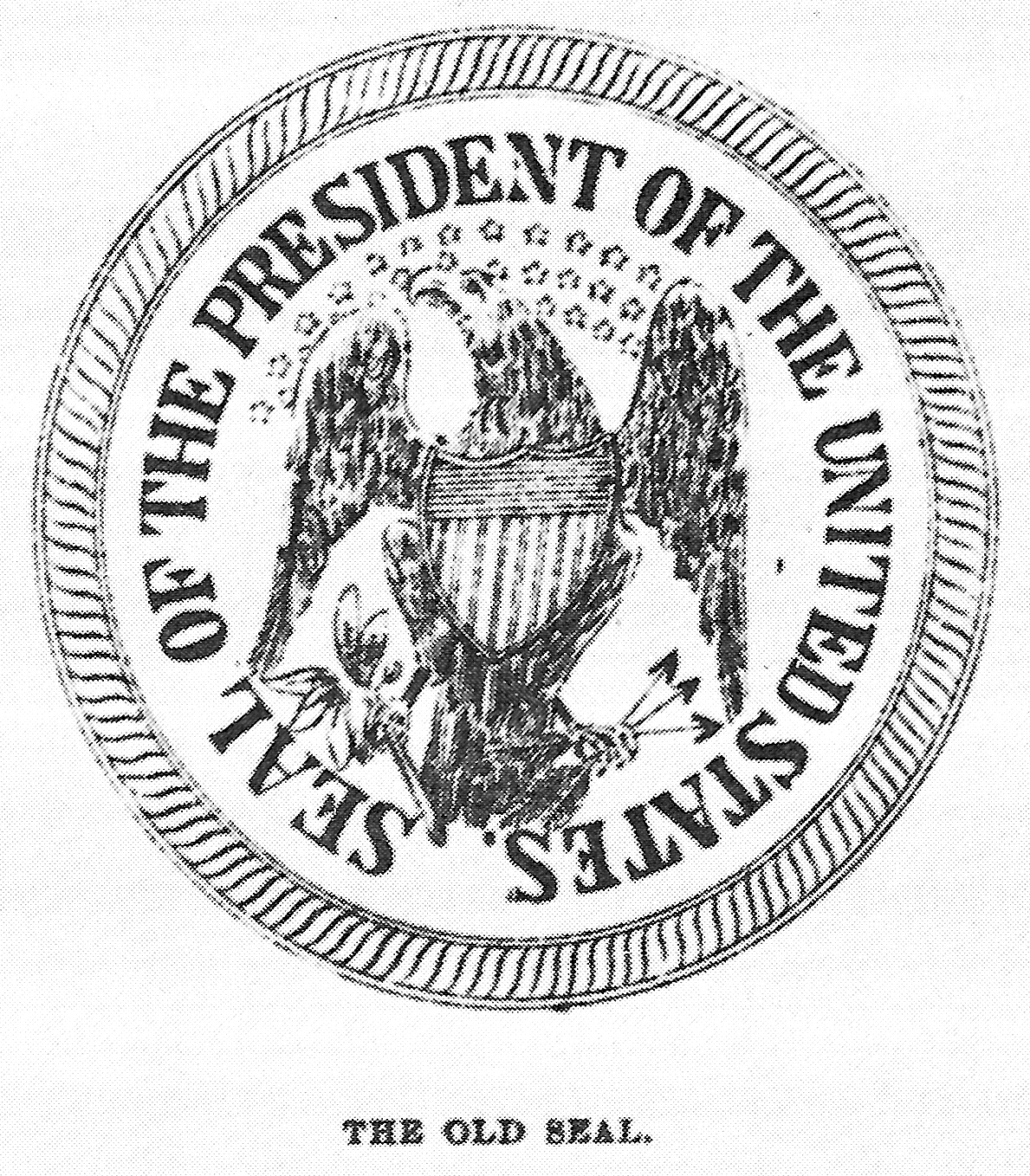
- Seal of the president (1840–1850)

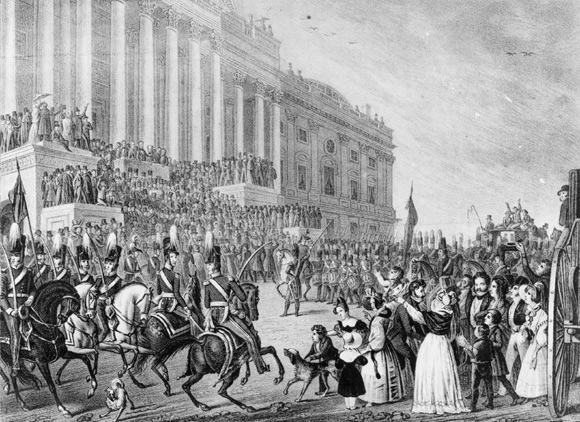
Inauguration 1841

When Harrison came to Washington, he wanted to show that he was still the steadfast hero of Tippecanoe and that he was a better educated and more thoughtful man than the backwoods caricature portrayed in the campaign. He took the oath of office on March 4, 1841, a cold and wet day. He braved the chilly weather and chose not to wear an overcoat or a hat, rode on horseback to the grand ceremony, and then delivered the longest inaugural address in American history at 8,445 words. It took him nearly two hours to read, although his friend and fellow Whig Daniel Webster had edited it for length. Freehling opines that speeches like this were actually common at the time, and that its irony was rich, as Harrison, "a lifelong office seeker, elected by deeply partisan politics, harshly criticized both practices".

The inaugural address was a detailed statement of the Whig agenda, a repudiation of Jackson's and Van Buren's policies, and the first and only formal articulation by Harrison of his approach to the presidency. The address began with Harrison's sincere regard for the trust being placed in him:

However strong may be my present purpose to realize the expectations of a magnanimous and confiding people, I too well understand the dangerous temptations to which I shall be exposed from the magnitude of the power which it has been the pleasure of the people to commit to my hands not to place my chief confidence upon the aid of that Almighty Power which has hitherto protected me and enabled me to bring to favorable issues other important but still greatly inferior trusts heretofore confided to me by my country.

Harrison promised to re-establish the Bank of the United States and extend its capacity for credit by issuing paper currency in Henry Clay's American system. He intended to rely on the judgment of Congress in legislative matters, using his veto power only if an act were unconstitutional, and to reverse Jackson's spoils system of executive patronage. He promised to use patronage to create a qualified staff, not to enhance his own standing in government, and under no circumstance would he run for a second term. He condemned the financial excesses of the prior administration and pledged not to interfere with congressional financial policy. All in all, Harrison committed to a weak presidency, deferring to "the First Branch", the Congress, in keeping with Whig principles.

He addressed the nation's already hotly debated issue of slavery. As a slaveholder himself, Harrison agreed with the right of states to control the matter:

The lines, too, separating powers to be exercised by the citizens of one state from those of another seem to be so distinctly drawn as to leave no room for misunderstanding…The attempt of those of one state to control the domestic institutions of another can only result in feelings of distrust and jealousy, the certain harbingers of disunion, violence, and civil war, and the ultimate destruction of our free institutions.

When about to conclude his remarks, he incorporated his reliance upon the country's freedom of religion while taking pains to present himself as part of the religious mainstream rather than a dissenter or member of a minority faith:

I deem the present occasion sufficiently important and solemn to justify me in expressing to my fellow-citizens a profound reverence for the Christian religion and a thorough conviction that sound morals, religious liberty, and a just sense of religious responsibility are essentially connected with all true and lasting happiness; and to that good Being who has blessed us by the gifts of civil and religious freedom, who watched over and prospered the labors of our fathers and has hitherto preserved to us institutions far exceeding in excellence those of any other people, let us unite in fervently commending every interest of our beloved country in all future time.

Harrison's lengthy speech offered vague clues about what his presidency would offer to the people of the United States. He declared he would only serve for one term in office and not abuse his veto power. Harrison was against devising financial schemes for the nation; rather, he left that wholly to Congress. He was against agitating the Southern United States on the slavery question. He did not discuss the tariff and distribution. He said little of the national bank, except he mentioned he was open to paper money, rather than metallic currency. Harrison's concept of the presidency was very limited. This followed closely with Harrison's Whig political ideology.

Following the speech, he rode through the streets in the inaugural parade, stood in a three-hour receiving line at the White House, and attended three inaugural balls that evening, including one at Carusi's Saloon entitled the "Tippecanoe" ball with 1,000 guests who had paid $10 per person (equal to $371 in 2025).

=== The press of patronage ===
Clay was a leader of the Whigs and a powerful legislator, as well as a frustrated presidential candidate in his own right, and he expected to have substantial influence in the Harrison administration. He ignored his own platform plank of overturning the "spoils" system and attempted to influence Harrison's actions before and during his brief presidency, especially in putting forth his own preferences for Cabinet offices and other presidential appointments. Harrison rebuffed his aggression, saying, "Mr. Clay, you forget that I am the President." The dispute escalated when Harrison named as Secretary of State Daniel Webster, Clay's arch-rival for control of the Whig Party. Harrison also appeared to give Webster's supporters some highly coveted patronage positions. His sole concession to Clay was to name his protégé John J. Crittenden to the post of Attorney General. Despite this, the contretemps continued until the president's death.

Harrison cabinet
| Office | Name | Term |
| President | William Henry Harrison | 1841 |
| Vice President | John Tyler | 1841 |
| Secretary of State | Daniel Webster | 1841 |
| Secretary of the Treasury | Thomas Ewing | 1841 |
| Secretary of War | John Bell | 1841 |
| Attorney General | John J. Crittenden | 1841 |
| Postmaster General | Francis Granger | 1841 |
| Secretary of the Navy | George Edmund Badger | 1841 |

Clay was not the only one who hoped to benefit from Harrison's election. Hordes of office applicants came to the White House, which was then open to any who wanted a meeting with the president. Most of Harrison's business during his month-long presidency involved extensive social obligations and receiving visitors at the White House. He was advised to have an administration in place before the inauguration but declined, wanting to focus on the festivities. As such, job seekers awaited him at all hours and filled the Executive Mansion, with no process for organizing and vetting them.

Harrison wrote in a letter dated March 10, "I am so much harassed by the multitude that calls upon me that I can give no proper attention to any business of my own." U.S. Marshal of the District of Columbia Alexander Hunter recalled an incident in which Harrison was besieged by office seekers who were preventing him from getting to a cabinet meeting; when his pleas for their consideration were ignored, Harrison finally "accepted their petitions, which filled his arms and pockets". Another anecdote of the time recounted that the halls were so full one afternoon that in order to get from one room to the next, Harrison had to be helped out a window, walked the length of the White House exterior, and then helped in through another window.

Harrison took seriously his pledge to reform executive appointments, visiting each of the six cabinet departments to observe its operations and issuing through Webster an order that electioneering by employees would be considered grounds for dismissal. He resisted pressure from other Whigs over partisan patronage. A group arrived in his office on March 16 to demand the removal of all Democrats from any appointed office, and Harrison proclaimed, "So help me God, I will resign my office before I can be guilty of such an iniquity!" His own cabinet attempted to countermand his appointment of John Chambers as Governor of the Iowa Territory in favor of Webster's friend James Wilson. Webster attempted to press this decision at a March 25 cabinet meeting, and Harrison asked him to read aloud a handwritten note, which said simply "William Henry Harrison, President of the United States". Harrison then stood and declared: "William Henry Harrison, President of the United States, tells you, gentlemen, that, by God, John Chambers shall be governor of Iowa!"

Harrison's only other official decision of consequence was whether to call Congress into a special session. He and Clay had disagreed over the necessity of such a session, and Harrison's cabinet proved evenly divided, so the president initially vetoed the idea. Clay pressed him on the special session on March 13, but Harrison rebuffed him and told him not to visit the White House again, to address him only in writing. A few days later, however, Treasury Secretary Thomas Ewing reported to Harrison that federal funds were in such trouble that the government could not continue to operate until Congress's regularly scheduled session in December; Harrison thus relented, and proclaimed the special session on March 17, in the interests of "the condition of the revenue and finance of the country". The session would have begun on May 31 as scheduled if Harrison had lived.

== Death and funeral ==
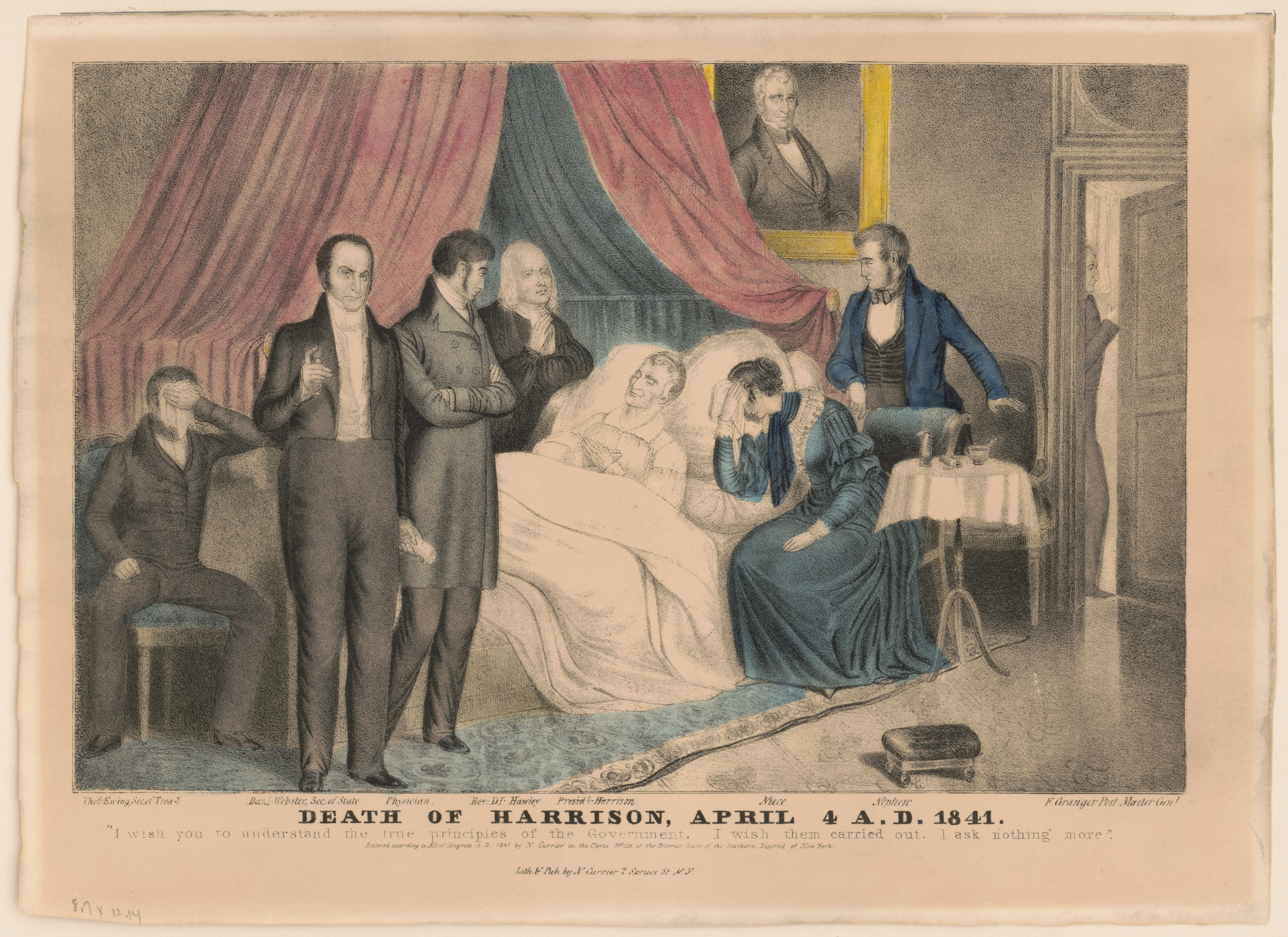
An illustration depicting the death of Harrison, April 4, 1841

Harrison had been physically exhausted by the constant stream of office seekers and a demanding social schedule. He also frequently ignored the cold late-winter weather, often going out without wearing appropriate clothing, perhaps weakening his immune system. After delivering a two-hour inaugural address in the rain on March 4 without a hat or coat, Harrison continued to expose himself to the elements. Three weeks later on March 24, 1841, Harrison took his daily morning walk to local markets, again without a coat or hat. Despite being caught in a sudden rainstorm, he did not change his wet clothes upon returning to the White House. On March 26, Harrison became ill with cold-like symptoms and sent for his doctor, Thomas Miller, though he told the doctor he felt better after having taken medication for "fatigue and mental anxiety". The next day, Saturday, the doctor was called again, and arrived to find Harrison in bed with a "severe chill", after taking another early morning walk. Miller applied mustard plaster to his stomach and gave him a mild laxative, and he felt better that afternoon. At 4:00 a.m. March 28, Harrison developed severe pain in the side and the doctor initiated bloodletting; the procedure was terminated when there was a drop in his pulse rate. Miller also applied heated cups to the president's skin to enhance blood flow. The doctor then gave him castor oil and medicines to induce vomiting, and diagnosed him with pneumonia in the right lung. A team of doctors was called in Monday, March 29, and they confirmed right lower lobe pneumonia. Harrison was then administered laudanum, opium, and camphor, along with wine and brandy.

No official announcements were made concerning Harrison's illness, which fueled public speculation and concern the longer he remained out of public view. Washington society had noticed his uncharacteristic absence from church on Sunday. Conflicting and unconfirmed newspaper reports were based on leaks by people with contacts in the White House. A Washington paper reported on April 1, that Harrison's health was decidedly better. In fact, Harrison's condition had seriously weakened, and Cabinet members and family were summoned to the White House—his wife Anna had remained in Ohio due to her own illness. According to papers in Washington on Friday, Harrison had rallied, despite a Baltimore Sun report that his condition was of a "more dangerous character". A reporter for the New York Commercial indicated that "the country's people were deeply distressed and many of them in tears."

During the evening of April 3, Harrison developed severe diarrhea and became delirious, and at 8:30 p.m. he uttered his last words, to his attending doctor, assumed to be for Vice President John Tyler: "Sir, I wish you to understand the true principles of the government. I wish them carried out. I ask nothing more." Harrison died at 12:30 a.m. on April 4, 1841, nine days after becoming ill and exactly one month after taking the oath of office; he was the first president to die in office. His wife Anna was still in Ohio packing for the trip to Washington when she learned of him dying. She never moved into the White House. Their daughter-in-law Jane Irwin Harrison, the widow of William Henry Harrison Jr., had served as hostess of the White House in Anna's place while Harrison was president.

The prevailing theory at the time was that his illness had been caused by the bad weather at his inauguration three weeks earlier. Jane McHugh and Philip A. Mackowiak did an analysis in Clinical Infectious Diseases (2014), examining Miller's notes and records showing that the White House water supply was downstream of public sewage, and they concluded that he likely died of septic shock due to "enteric fever" (typhoid or paratyphoid fever).

A 30-day period of mourning commenced following the president's death. The White House hosted various public ceremonies, modeled after European royal funeral practices. An invitation-only funeral service was also held on April 7 in the East Room of the White House, after which Harrison's coffin was brought to Congressional Cemetery in Washington, D.C., where it was placed in the Public Vault. Solomon Northup gave an account of the procession in Twelve Years a Slave:

The next day there was a great pageant in Washington. The roar of cannon and the tolling of bells filled the air, while many houses were shrouded with crape, and the streets were black with people. As the day advanced, the procession made its appearance, coming slowly through the Avenue, carriage after carriage, in long succession, while thousands upon thousands followed on foot—all moving to the sound of melancholy music. They were bearing the dead body of Harrison to the grave…. I remember distinctly how the window glass would break and rattle to the ground, after each report of the cannon they were firing in the burial ground.

That June, Harrison's body was transported by train and river barge to North Bend, Ohio, and he was buried on July 7 at the summit of Mt. Nebo, which is now the William Henry Harrison Tomb State Memorial.

=== Tyler's accession to office ===
On April 5, Fletcher Webster, the son of Secretary of State Daniel Webster, notified Tyler that Harrison had died in office. Tyler had been visiting family in Williamsburg and returned to Washington on the morning of April 6. That same day, Tyler was sworn into office in front of Harrison's cabinet, officially beginning his presidency. On April 9, Tyler gave a brief inaugural address. In his address to the nation, Tyler did not give any personal consolation to Harrison's widow Anna or family members. Tyler did compliment Harrison by saying Harrison had been elected for a "great work" of purging the federal government of corruption. Tyler and his family moved into the White House one week after Harrison's funeral, before Harrison's 30-day mourning period was over. The White House state rooms were still hung with black mourning crêpe.

=== Impact of Harrison's death ===
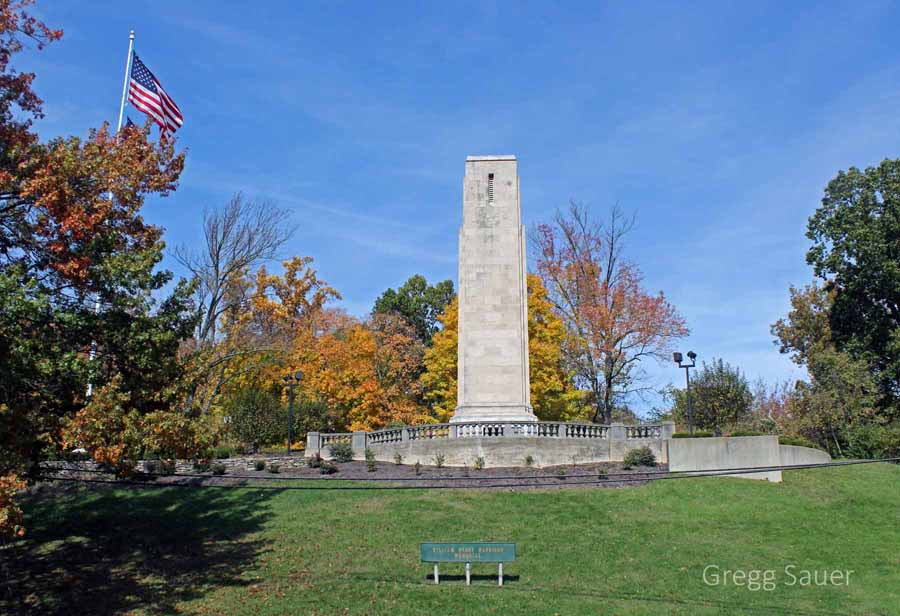
The William Henry Harrison Memorial in North Bend, Ohio

Harrison's death called attention to an ambiguity in Article II, Section 1, Clause 6, of the Constitution regarding succession to the presidency. The Constitution specifically provided for the vice president to take over the "Powers and Duties of the said Office" in the event of a president's removal, death, resignation, or inability, but it was unclear whether the vice president formally became president of the United States, or simply temporarily assumed the powers and duties of that office, in a case of succession.

Harrison's cabinet insisted that Tyler was "Vice President acting as President". Tyler was resolute in his claim to the title of President and in his determination to exercise the full powers of the presidency. The cabinet consulted with Chief Justice Roger Taney and decided that, if Tyler took the presidential oath of office, he would assume the office of president. Tyler obliged and was sworn into office on April 6, 1841. Congress convened, and on May 31, 1841, after a short period of debate in both houses, passed a joint resolution, which confirmed Tyler as president for the remainder of Harrison's term. This succession became the Tyler Precedent, which was followed on seven occasions when an incumbent president died prior to being written into the Constitution in 1967 through Section One of the Twenty-fifth Amendment.

== Legacy ==
=== Historical reputation ===
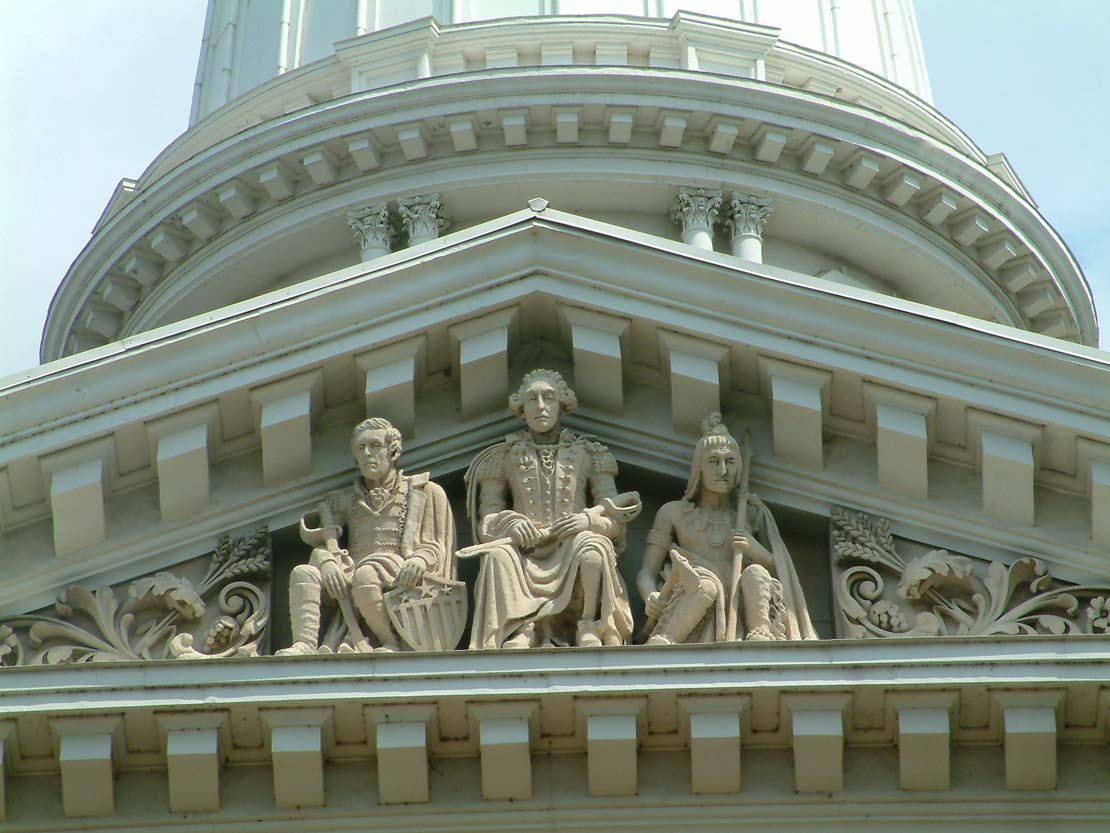
Harrison (on left) at Tippecanoe County Courthouse, Lafayette, Indiana

Among Harrison's most enduring legacies is the series of treaties that he negotiated and signed with Indian leaders during his tenure as the Indiana territorial governor. As part of the treaty negotiations, the tribes ceded large tracts of land in the west which provided additional acreage for purchase and settlement by the nation.

Harrison's long-term impact on American politics includes his campaigning methods, which laid the foundation for modern presidential campaign tactics. Harrison died nearly penniless, and Congress voted his wife Anna a presidential widow's pension of $25,000, one year of Harrison's salary (equivalent to about $780,000 in 2025). She also received the right to mail letters free of charge.

Freehling refers to Harrison as "the most dominant figure in the evolution of the Northwest territories into the Upper Midwest today". Harrison, age 68 at the time of his inauguration, was the oldest person to assume the U.S. presidency, a distinction he held until 1981, when Ronald Reagan was inaugurated at age 69. Harrison also became the last U.S. president to wear a powdered wig tied in a queue according to the style of the late 18th century in his youth while he was serving as an officer of the U.S. Army in the 1790s when a wig was worn as a standard part of the military uniform.

Harrison's son John Scott Harrison represented Ohio in the House of Representatives between 1853 and 1857. Harrison's grandson Benjamin Harrison of Indiana served as the 23rd president from 1889 to 1893, making William and Benjamin Harrison the only grandparent-grandchild pair of presidents.

=== Honors and tributes ===
Various monuments and memorial statues have been erected in tribute to Harrison. There are public statues of him in downtown Indianapolis, Cincinnati's Piatt Park, the Tippecanoe County Courthouse, Harrison County, Indiana, and Owen County, Indiana. Numerous counties and towns also bear his name.

The village of North Bend, Ohio, honors Harrison every year with a parade to celebrate his birthday. The Gen. William Henry Harrison Headquarters in Franklinton, Ohio, commemorates him. The house was his military headquarters from 1813 to 1814. On February 19, 2009, the United States Mint released the ninth coin in the Presidential $1 Coin Program, bearing Harrison's likeness.

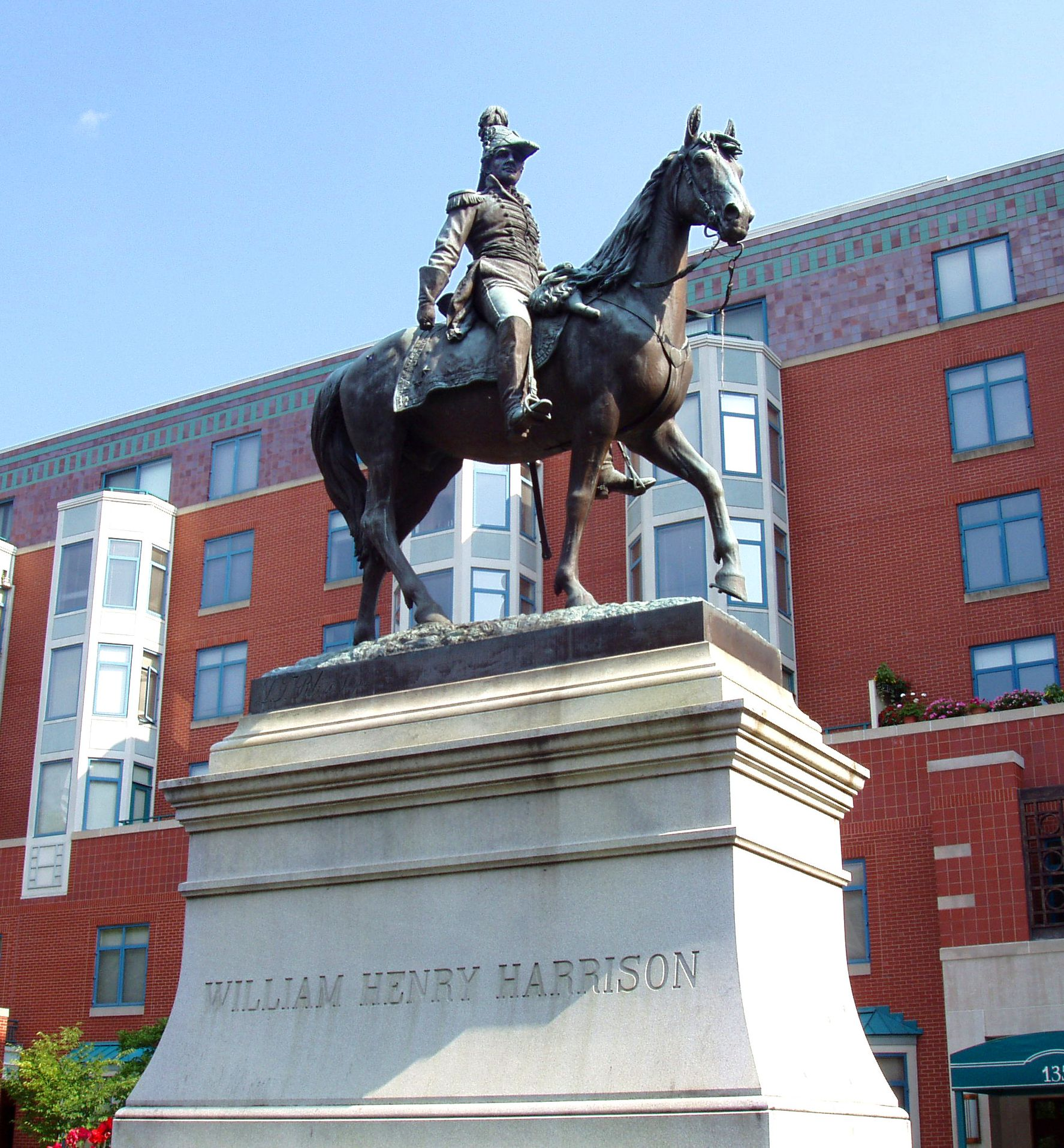
Equestrian statue of Harrison in Cincinnati, by Louis Rebisso

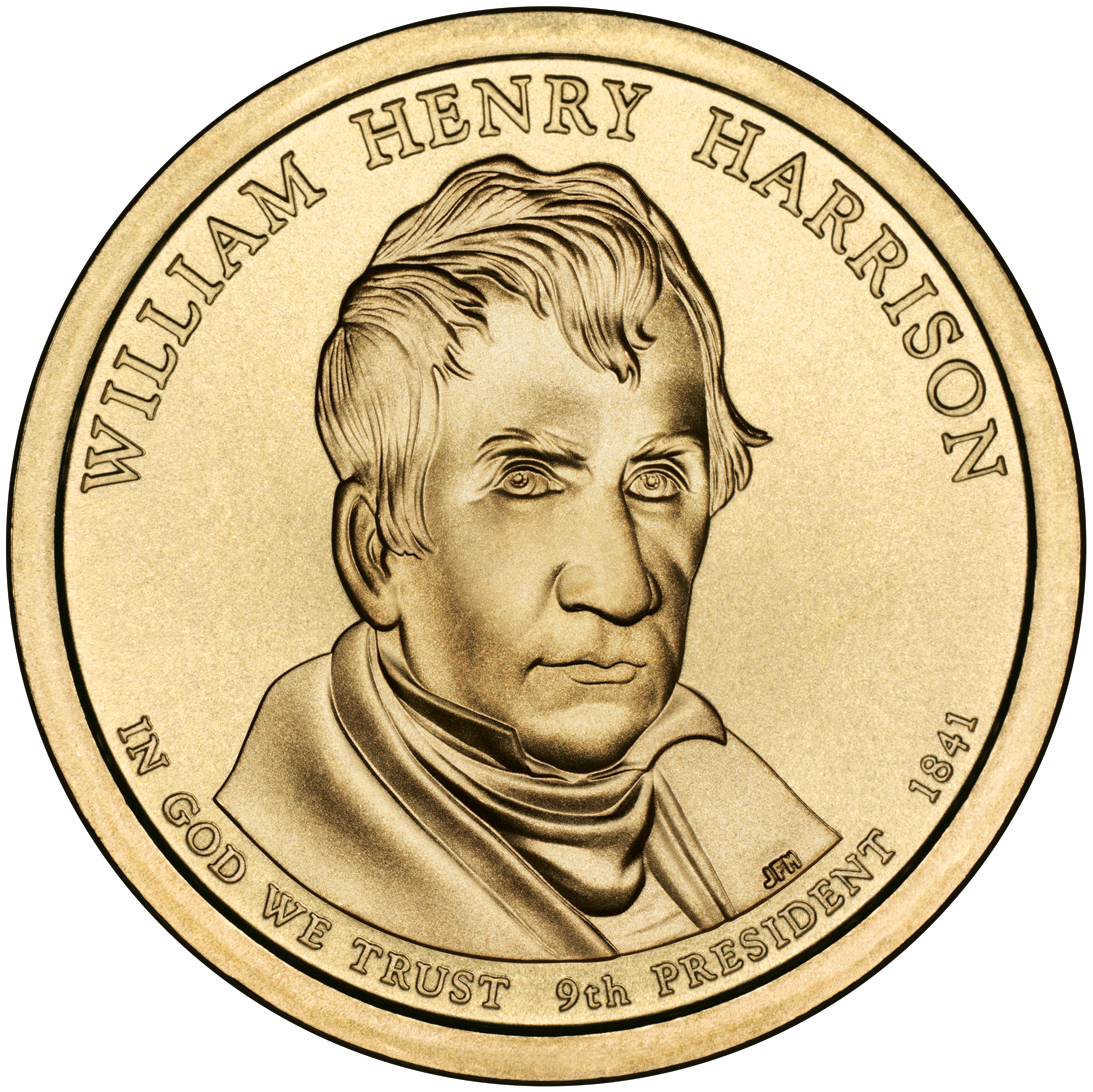
2009 presidential dollar coin

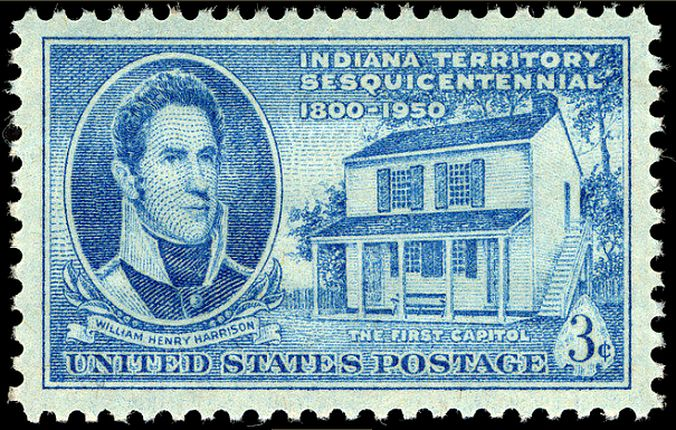
1950 postal issue of Harrison commemorating Indiana's statehood

== See also ==
- Curse of Tippecanoe
- List of presidents of the United States
- List of presidents of the United States by previous experience
- List of presidents of the United States who died in office
- List of presidents of the United States who owned slaves
- Presidents of the United States on U.S. postage stamps
- Second Party System

Political offices
| Preceded by Winthrop Sargent | Secretary of the Northwest Territory; 1798–1799 | Succeeded by Charles Willing Byrd |
| New office | Governor of the Indiana Territory; 1800–1812 | Succeeded by John Gibson; Acting |
| Preceded by Amos Stoddard as Commandant of the District of Louisiana | Governor of the District of Louisiana; 1804–1805 | Succeeded by James Wilkinson as Governor of the Louisiana Territory |
| Preceded by Martin Van Buren | President of the United States; 1841 | Succeeded by John Tyler |
U.S. House of Representatives
| New constituency | Delegate to the U.S. House of Representatives from the Northwest Territory's at-large congressional district 1799–1800 | Succeeded by William McMillan |
| Preceded by John McLean | Member of the U.S. House of Representatives from Ohio's 1st congressional district 1816–1819 | Succeeded by Thomas R. Ross |
Ohio Senate
| Preceded by George Torrence | Member of the Ohio Senate from Hamilton County; 1819–1821; Served alongside: Ephraim Brown | Succeeded by Benjamin Piatt |
U.S. Senate
| Preceded by Ethan Allen Brown | U.S. Senator (Class 3) from Ohio; 1825–1828; Served alongside: Benjamin Ruggles | Succeeded by Jacob Burnet |
| Preceded by Andrew Jackson | Chair of the Senate Military Affairs Committee; 1825–1828 | Succeeded by Thomas Hart Benton |
Diplomatic posts
| Preceded by Beaufort Watts | United States Minister to Gran Colombia; 1829 | Succeeded by Thomas Patrick Moore |
Party political offices
| New political party | Whig nominee for President of the United States; 1836¹, 1840 | Succeeded by Henry Clay |
Notes and references
1. The Whig Party ran four candidates in 1836. Harrison ran alongside Hugh Lawson White, Daniel Webster, and Willie P. Mangum.
