= John Scott Harrison =

American politician (1804–1878)

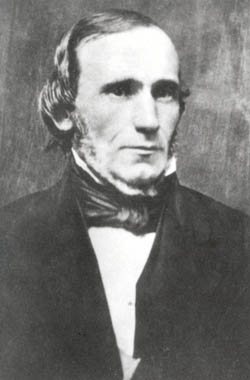

Member of the U.S. House of Representatives from Ohio's 2nd district
- In office March 4, 1853 – March 3, 1857
- Preceded by: Lewis D. Campbell
- Succeeded by: William S. Groesbeck

Personal details
- Born: October 4, 1804 Vincennes, Indiana, U.S.
- Died: May 25, 1878 (aged 73) North Bend, Ohio, U.S.
- Party: Whig; Anti-Nebraska
- Spouses: Lucretia Knapp Johnson (m. 1824; died 1830) Elizabeth Ramsey Irwin (m. 1831; died 1850)
- Relations: Harrison family of Virginia
- Children: 13, including Benjamin
- Parents: William Henry Harrison; Anna Tuthill Harrison
- Profession: Politician, farmer

John Scott Harrison (October 4, 1804 – May 25, 1878) was an American politician who served as a member of the United States House of Representatives from Ohio from 1853 to 1857. Harrison was a son of U.S. president William Henry Harrison and First Lady Anna Harrison as well as the father of U.S. president Benjamin Harrison. He is the only person to have been both a father and son of a U.S. president.

== Early life ==
Harrison was born on October 4, 1804, in Vincennes, Indiana, where Grouseland, the family home was located. He was one of ten children born to then governor of the Indiana Territory, and future president, William Henry Harrison and future first lady Anna Tuthill Symmes.

Harrison completed preparatory studies and studied law. He later abandoned this to become a farmer. His father, William Henry Harrison had given him 800 acres of farmland by the Ohio River. Low prices for the farm's produce and flooding of the farm led to financial struggles.

== Career ==
He was elected a Whig to the U.S. House of Representatives in 1852, reelected an Anti-Nebraska candidate in 1854, and served from 1853 to 1857. In 1855, he declined "the use of his name in connection with the office of Governor at the coming election". After being defeated for a third term in 1856, Harrison retired to his estate "Point Farm" in North Bend, Ohio.

In August 1860 Harrison, along with Larz Anderson, was nominated as Constitutional Union Party candidate (organized largely by former Whig Party members from the Southern United States who opposed secession) for the second district at the Bell and Everett Convention. In 1861, he was nominated on the Democratic ticket as Lieutenant Governor of Ohio along with Hugh J. Jewett as Governor.

== Personal life ==
In 1824, he married Lucretia Knapp Johnson (1804–1830). They had three children:

- Elizabeth Short Harrison (1825–1904), who married George Coleman Eaton.
- William Henry Harrison (1827–1829), who died young.
- Sarah Lucretia Harrison (1829–1917), who married Thomas Jefferson Devin.

On August 12, 1831, in Cincinnati, Ohio, he married Elizabeth Ramsey Irwin (1810–1850), a daughter of Archibald Irwin and Mary (née Ramsey) Irwin. He and Elizabeth had 10 children:

- Lt.-Col. Archibald Harrison (1832–1870); Commander, 27th Indiana Infantry Regiment who contracted tuberculosis; he married Elizabeth Sheets in 1858.
- Benjamin Harrison (1833–1901), who became a U.S. Senator in 1881 before becoming the 23rd President of the United States in 1889.
- Mary Jane Harrison (1835–1867), who married Samuel Vance Morris, later a member of the Minnesota House of Representatives, in 1859.
- Anna Symmes Harrison (1837–1838), who died young.
- John Irwin Harrison (1839), who died young.
- Carter Bassett Harrison (1840–1905); Captain, 51st Ohio Infantry Regiment; he married Sophia Ridgely Dashiell in 1863.
- Anna Symmes Harrison (1842–1926), who married her sister's widower, Samuel Vance Morris, in 1869.
- John Scott Harrison Jr. (1844–1926), who married Sophia Elizabeth Lytle.
- James Findlay Harrison (1847–1848), who died young.
- James Irwin Harrison (1849–1850), who died young.

After his father's death, in 1841, his mother moved in with his family to help raise the children.

Harrison died in North Bend, Ohio on May 25, 1878, aged 73, the last surviving child of William Henry Harrison. He was interred in the family tomb in North Bend, today the William Henry Harrison Tomb State Memorial, with his parents and other family members. Harrison's body was stolen by grave robbers until it was eventually returned to its final place of burial.

=== Body snatching ===
At that time it was common practice for graves to be robbed for recently deceased bodies for use in teaching dissection and anatomy at medical colleges. As a result, many precautions were taken to secure Harrison's grave, including building a cemented brick vault, filling the grave with earth mixed with heavy stones, and employing a watchman to check the grave each hour of every night for a week.

On the day of Harrison's funeral, it was discovered that the body of Augustus Devin, which had been buried the previous week in an adjoining grave, had been stolen. The following day, one of John Harrison's sons, often believed to be Benjamin, together with a friend of Devin, traveled to Cincinnati to look for his body. With search warrants in hand they went to the Ohio Medical College, where they discovered not Devin's body but the naked body of John Scott Harrison hanging from a rope in a chute. Devin's body was later found preserved in a vat of brine at the medical college of the University of Michigan.

The outrage over the act, amid changing sensibilities regarding death, contributed materially to passage of the Ohio Anatomy Law of 1881, a landmark statute, whereby medical schools were provided with unclaimed bodies, which in turn discouraged grave robbers by removing their primary market. As to the personal results, suits were brought against the Ohio Medical College; the Harrison estate was entered in a separate damage suit, in the amount of $10,000. The result and decision in the three civil suits brought has been lost in the passage of time, and no documentation is known to exist with this specific information.

U.S. House of Representatives
Preceded by Lewis D. Campbell	Member of the U.S. House of Representatives from Ohio's 2nd congressional district March 4, 1853 – March 3, 1857	Succeeded by William S. Groesbeck
