= Carusi's Saloon =

Venue in Washington, D.C.

Coordinates: 38.8939°N 77.0268°W

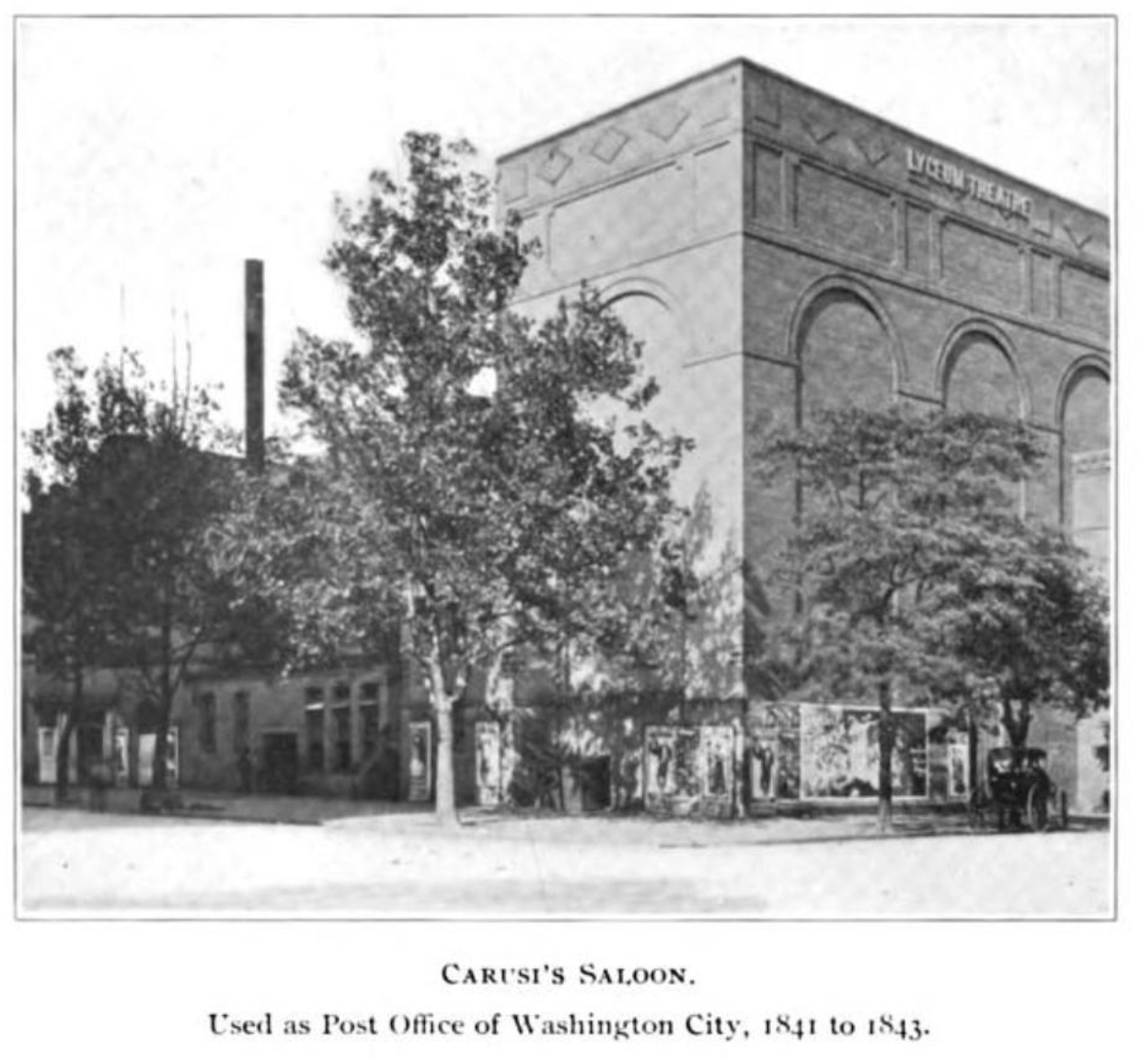
The venue in the early 1900s

Carusi's Saloon was a social venue in Washington, D.C. that operated during the 19th century. According to the White House Historical Association, it was a popular destination that hosted notable inaugural balls for several American presidents.

== History ==
The venue was founded and operated by Gaetano Carusi, a Sicilian and member of the U.S. Marine Band. In 1837, it was located at 11th and C Streets NW in Washington. The venue remained popular into the late 1850s but eventually ceased standard operations around that time.

== Notable performances ==
- In 1837, the inaugural ball for Martin Van Buren took place at Carusi's.
- In 1841, the inaugural ball for William Henry Harrison took place at Carusi's.
- In 1843, Polish officer Gaspar Tochman gave a lecture at Carusi's. He was described as a "patriot" who lectured on the tenuous relationship between Poland and the partitioning powers at the time. The Baltimore Sun described his reception in Washington as "glowing."
- In 1845, one of the inaugural balls for James K. Polk took place at Carusi's. Tickets were priced at $10, and a piece in The New York Times described this event as meant for the "aristocracy of Locofocodom".
- In 1853, Thackeray gave lectures on English humorists at Carusi's. The Washington Star described his performance as being monotone.
- Abraham Lincoln attended a minstrel show by the Ethiopian Serenaders at Carusi's.

== See also ==
- History of Washington, D.C.
