= Inauguration of George Washington =

Inauguration of George Washington may refer to:

- First inauguration of George Washington, 1789
- Second inauguration of George Washington, 1793
