= William Henry Harrison Tomb State Memorial =

Burial location of the 9th U.S. president

- U.S. National Register of Historic Places
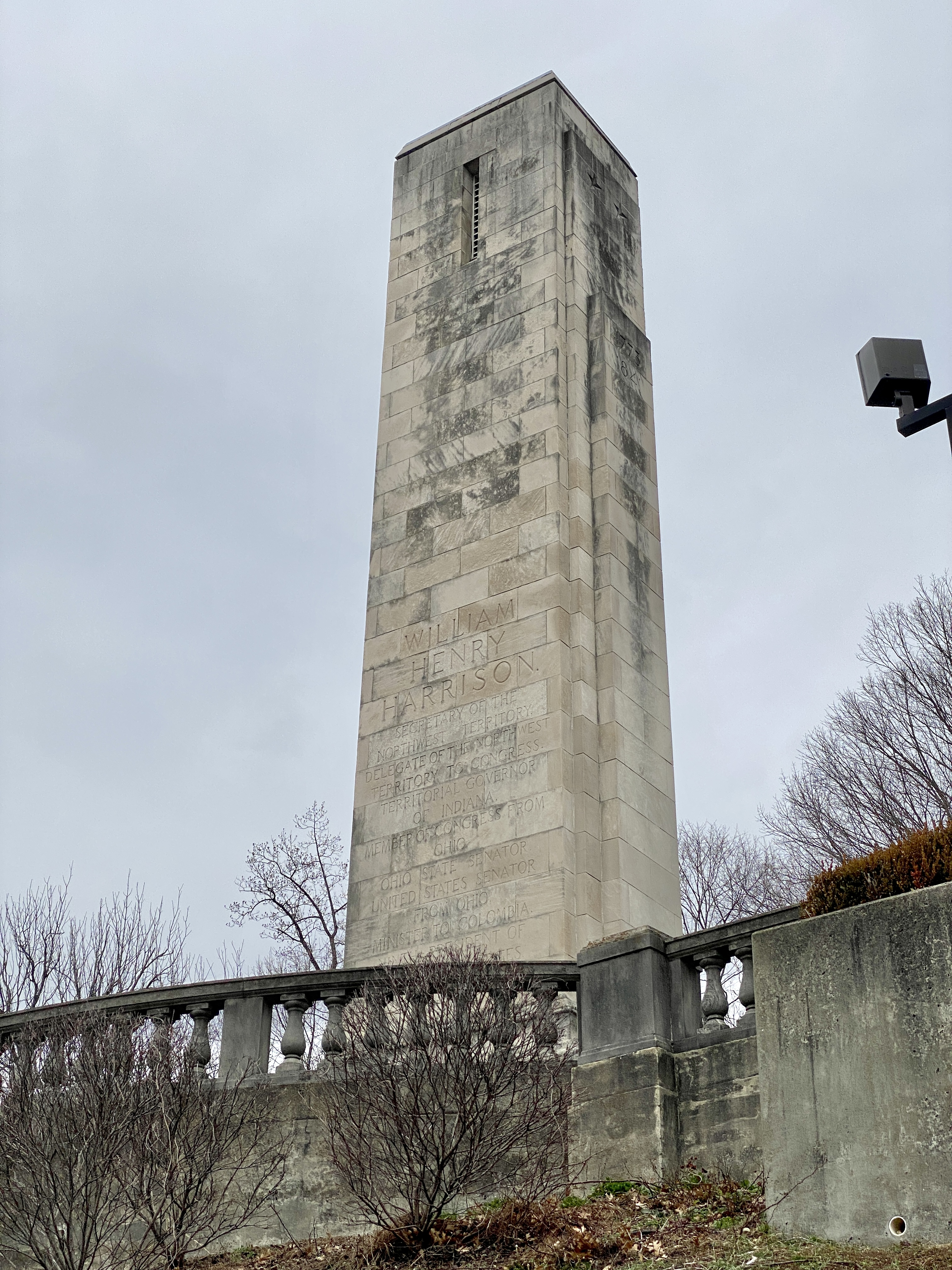
- The monument in 2023

- Location within Ohio Location within the United States
- Interactive map showing the location of William Henry Harrison Tomb State Memorial
- Location: Mount Nebo on State Route 128, North Bend, Ohio
- Coordinates: 39°9′02.7″N 84°45′03.5″W
- Area: 14 acres (5.7 ha)
- Built: 1841
- NRHP reference No.: 70000499
- Added to NRHP: November 10, 1970

The William Henry Harrison Tomb State Memorial is the final resting place of William Henry Harrison, ninth president of the United States, his wife Anna Harrison, and his son John Scott Harrison (father of the twenty-third president, Benjamin Harrison). It is located on Brower Road approximately one-half mile west of U.S. Route 50 in North Bend, Ohio.

Harrison died April 4, 1841, one month after taking office, and was buried in the Congressional Cemetery in Washington, D.C.; in June of that year, his remains were removed for transport to their final resting place in North Bend. The Harrison family chose a site at the crest of Mt. Nebo on the family estate and the interment occurred July 7, 1841. In 1871, John Harrison sold all but 6 acres (2.4 ha) of the estate. He offered this portion, containing the tomb and other burial sites, to the state of Ohio in exchange for a pledge of perpetual maintenance.

After several years of neglect, the tomb and grounds fell into a state of disrepair until 1919 when the Ohio General Assembly formally accepted the bequest and appropriated funds for its care. The tomb was listed in the National Register on November 10, 1970.

The tomb is managed by the Harrison - Symmes Memorial Foundation on behalf of the Ohio History Connection. In 2007, improvements at the site included installation of kiosks to educate visitors about Harrison, his role in settling the Ohio River Valley and U.S. history.

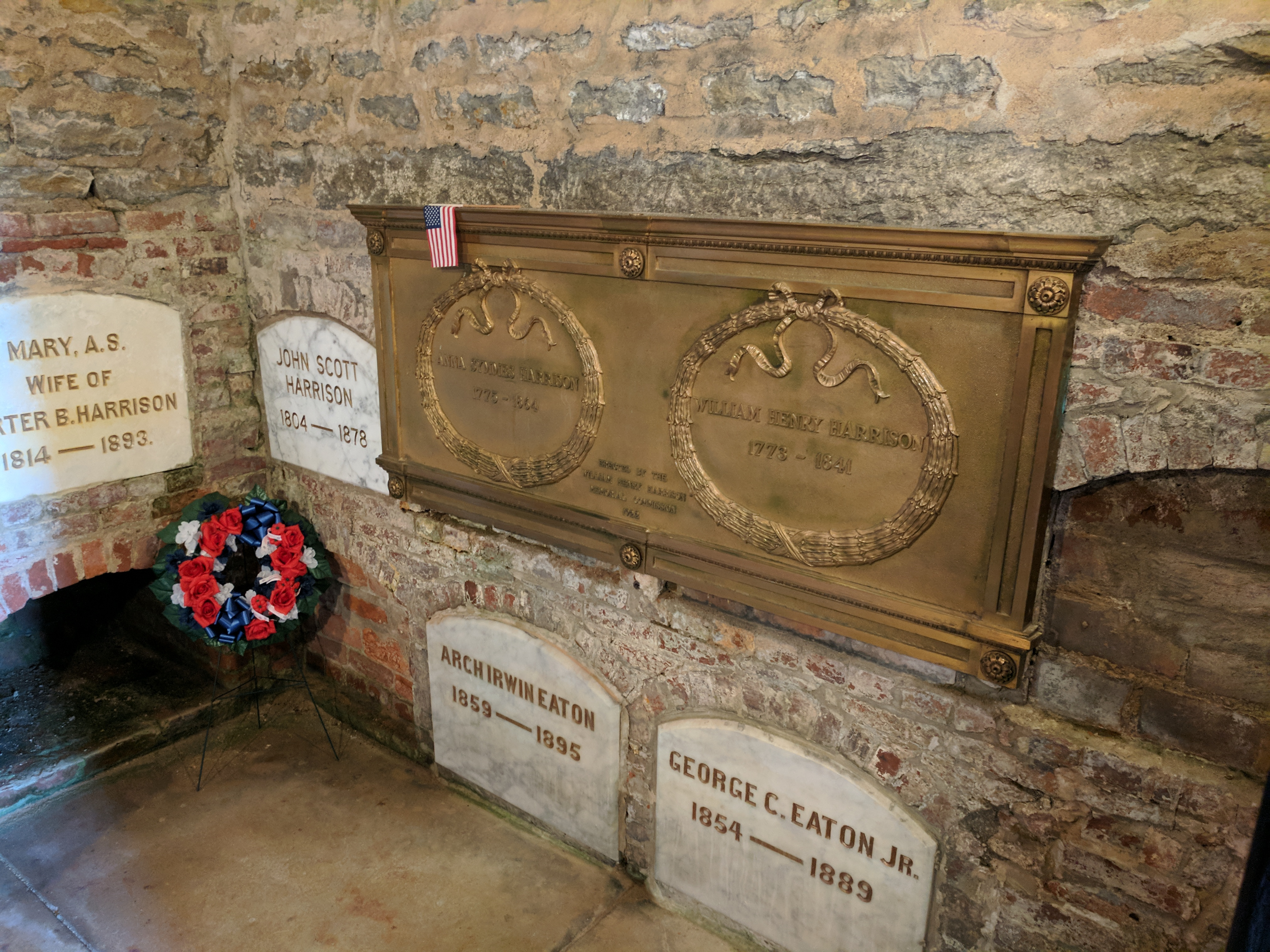
Inside the tomb of William Henry Harrison and family

== Historic uses ==
- Cemetery
- Graves/Burials

== See also ==
- List of burial places of presidents and vice presidents of the United States
