= Tyler Precedent =

1841 US constitutional-political precedent

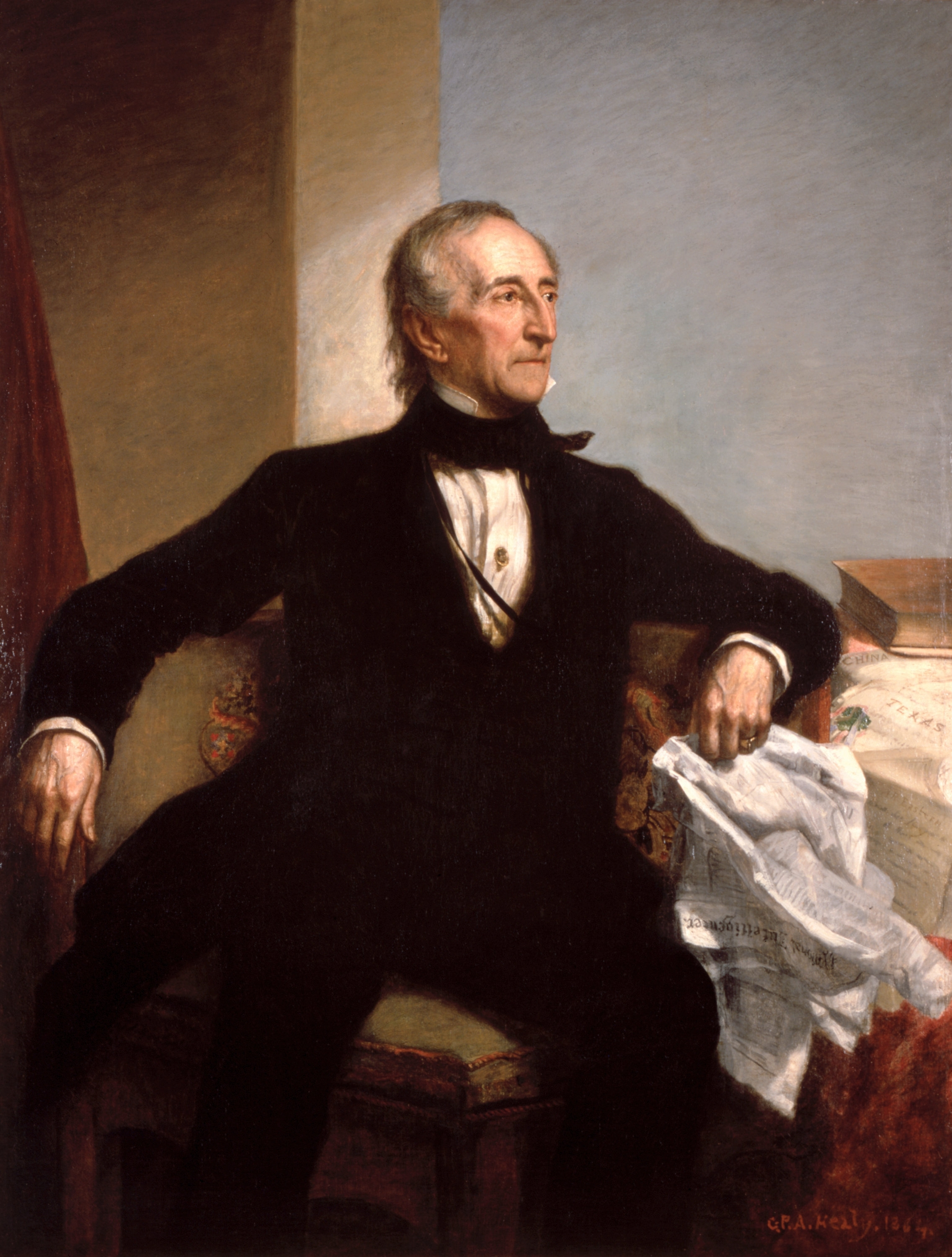
John Tyler, tenth president of the United States

The Tyler Precedent is the constitutional and political precedent set in 1841 by John Tyler, the vice president of the United States who ascended as president upon the death of President William Henry Harrison. At the time, the Constitution was unclear about whether the vice president should become president or merely act in that capacity upon a president's death. Asserting the former interpretation over the latter, Tyler had himself sworn in as president, moved into the White House, and assumed full presidential powers. Though a politically contentious move, Tyler's position won out and became the norm for presidential successions. Between Tyler's presidency and the passage of the Twenty-fifth Amendment to the United States Constitution codifying this arrangement, seven more individuals succeeded to the presidency in Tyler's manner.

== History ==
On April 4, 1841, President William Henry Harrison died 31 days after his inauguration, the shortest presidential term in American history. He had been in poor health for some time, and there had been a real prospect that he would not survive his full term.

Until this point, the question of what happened when the president died in office was entirely theoretical. Article II, Section I of the Constitution of the United States, was vague on the matter:

In case of removal of the president from office, or of his death, or inability to discharge the powers and duties of said office, the same shall devolve on the vice president...

Whether the vice president was to become a full-fledged president, or simply act as president while retaining the office of vice president, was completely open to interpretation. The Presidential Succession Act of 1792, which governed succession at the time, included provisions for a special presidential election, but only in cases when both the Presidency and Vice Presidency were vacant. When informed of President Harrison's death, Vice President John Tyler concluded that the Constitution's wording made him president without any qualifiers. Accordingly, Tyler returned to Washington, D.C. and immediately had himself sworn in as president. Meanwhile, Harrison's Cabinet, led by Secretary of State Daniel Webster, had already convened within an hour of his death and had voted to recognize Tyler only as vice president acting as president, not president. Furthermore, they decided that all major presidential decisions would be made by majority vote of the Cabinet, greatly diminishing Tyler's power. They informed Tyler about this arrangement during their first cabinet meeting.

Tyler was astounded, believing that by virtue of the Constitution, he was vested with full presidential powers. He immediately rejected the Cabinet's proposal, stating: "...I shall be pleased to avail myself of your counsel and advice, but I can never consent to being dictated to as to what I shall or shall not do. I, as president, will be responsible for my administration. I hope to have your cooperation in carrying out its measures. So long as you see fit to do this I shall be glad to have you with me. When you think otherwise, your resignations will be accepted." He then held a second inauguration before the Cabinet to bolster his claim before immediately moving into the White House, which was still black with mourning drapes for Harrison's death. This was a controversial series of maneuvers that earned Tyler considerable criticism from many Democrats and some Whigs, including the derisive nickname "His Accidency". Even so, Tyler adhered to his position, refusing to open mail that addressed him as anything other than president. Nominally a Whig, Tyler's liberal use of the veto power and his general opposition to Whig policies alienated him over the course of his term, and Tyler was soon formally expelled from the Whig Party. He eventually sought election to a full term under the Tyler Party (named after himself) and dropped out of the race. Despite his controversies, Tyler was successful in legitimizing his position as president, and both houses of Congress voted to recognize him as such.

== Constitutionality and legacy ==
The crux of the debate over whether the vice president was intended to become president upon the president's death depends on whether the antecedent of the phrase "the same" in Article II, Section I, of the Constitution is "the said office" or merely its "powers and duties". Another point of contention is the meaning of the word "devolve" in this context. According to historian Irving G. Williams, "it is axiomatic to political scientists that an office passes but that powers and duties devolve". This conclusion was also reached by political scientist Ruth C. Silva, who claimed that "it never [was] intended that the Vice President or designated officer should become President under the succession clause".

Indeed, despite Tyler's successful assertion, debate at the 1787 Constitutional Convention and subsequent writing on succession indicates that the Founding Fathers intended for the vice president to merely act as president until an election could be held to fill the vacancy, though little attention was generally paid to the subject of presidential succession. This sentiment was shared by former President John Quincy Adams himself, who adamantly referred to Tyler as "Vice President of the United States, John Tyler of Virginia, acting President of the Union." However, many other prominent political figures accepted Tyler as president, including Henry Clay, though Clay confidently predicted that Tyler's presidency would resemble a regency more than anything else.

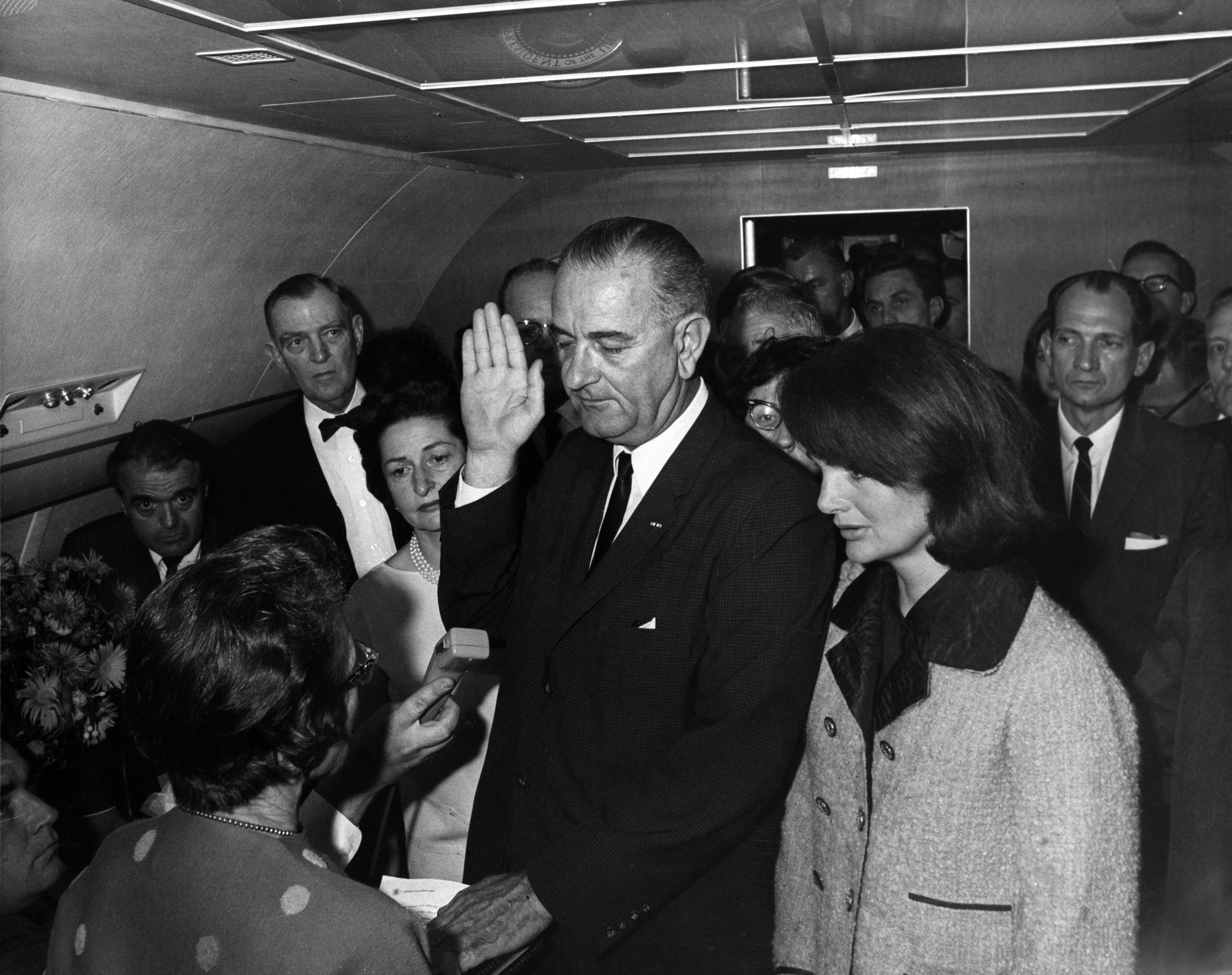
Lyndon Johnson taking the oath of office after the assassination of John F. Kennedy, November 22, 1963, in accordance with the Tyler Precedent

Despite mixed responses from political leaders and dubious constitutionality, the majority of the American public supported Tyler's decisive position, and the Tyler Precedent was followed by seven more vice presidents succeeding to the presidency after Tyler: Millard Fillmore in 1850, Andrew Johnson in 1865, Chester A. Arthur in 1881, Theodore Roosevelt in 1901, Calvin Coolidge in 1923, Harry S. Truman in 1945, and Lyndon B. Johnson in 1963. After the lattermost became president, the Twenty-fifth Amendment to the United States Constitution was ratified, codifying the Tyler Precedent into the U.S. Constitution.

Regardless of its popularity and initial debate, views differ significantly on whether Tyler set a good precedent by immediately succeeding to the presidency. According to Professor William W. Freehling, the Tyler Precedent was "by far his greatest contribution to the nation", an action that "paved the way for future orderly transfers of power".

== See also ==
- List of vice presidents of the United States
- Presidency of John Tyler
- Twelfth Amendment to the United States Constitution
