= Democratic Republican Party =

Democratic Republican Party or Democratic Republican may refer to:

- Democratic Republican Alliance, a defunct political party in France also known as the Democratic Republican Party
- Democratic-Republican Party, a defunct political party in the United States
- Democratic Republican Party (Portugal), a defunct political party in Portugal
- Democratic Republican Party (South Korea), a defunct political party in South Korea
- Democratic-Republican Party (1844), or Tyler Party
- Democratic-Republican Societies, local political organizations in the US active in the 1790s
- Democratic Republican Union, a Venezuelan political party
- Democratic Republicans (Italy), a defunct minor liberal political party in Italy
- Republican Democratic Movement, a defunct political party in Rwanda

== See also ==
- Democratic Party (disambiguation)
- Republican Party (disambiguation)
