= Ben Wattenberg =

American writer (1933–2015)

- Born: Joseph Ben Zion Wattenberg; August 26, 1933
- Died: June 28, 2015 (aged 81)
- Occupations: Author, political commentator, demographer

Benjamin Joseph Wattenberg (born Joseph Ben Zion Wattenberg; August 26, 1933 – June 28, 2015) was an American author, political commentator, and demographer associated with both Republican and Democratic presidents and politicians in the 1960s, 1970s, and 1980s. National Affairs argued that Wattenberg "challenged and reshaped conventional wisdom ... at least once a decade".

== Early life and education ==
Joseph Ben Zion Wattenberg was born on August 26, 1933, to Jewish immigrants from Eastern Europe in The Bronx. He grew up in the Sholem Aleichem Houses, which was built by Yiddish socialists in the 1920s, and attended DeWitt Clinton High School. In 1955, he graduated from Hobart College with a major in English. From 1955 to 1957, he was in the US Air Force, based in San Antonio. His first writing position was as a marine expert and edited Rivers & Harbors and Water Transportation Economics, and the McGraw-Hill Encyclopedia of Science and Technology. In 1975, Hobart College awarded Wattenberg an honorary Doctor of Laws degree and gave the commencement address to the graduating class that year.

== Career ==
=== Writing ===
Wattenberg first came to national attention in 1965 with the book This U.S.A.: An Unexpected Family Portrait of 194,067,296 Americans Drawn From the Census co-authored with census director Richard M. Scammon. The authors utilized data from the 1960 Census to support the theory that the United States had entered a golden age by citing decreases in the rates of divorce, traffic deaths, drug addictions, and school dropouts as well as greater economic and educational opportunity for African Americans. Critics of the book cited the civil rights movement and the Vietnam War to call it propaganda of the American society. His process of layering data with narrative led to the creation of the term "data journalism". The publication caught the attention of Lyndon B. Johnson and Wattenberg became a White House speechwriter in 1966. He later became an advisor to Hubert Humphrey's 1970 Senate race and Senator Henry M. Jackson's contest for the 1972 Democratic presidential nomination, and Democratic Party presidential primaries of 1976, and served on the 1972 and 1976 Democratic National Convention platform committees.

In 1970, Wattenberg teamed up again with Richard M. Scammon to write The Real Majority. The authors analyzed electoral data including, the 1968 presidential election, polls, and surveys to argue that the American electorate was centrist, and that parties or candidates, to be viable, must appeal to the "real majority" of the electorate at the center. The real majority was described as “middle aged, middle class and middle minded” and therefore politicians ought to move to the middle to remain in touch with mainstream America. As a Democrat, Watternberg intended the analysis to be embraced by his party; instead, the cultural touchstones of race, crime, and poverty were the basis of the campaign strategies of the Richard Nixon administration in the 1970 congressional elections and 1972 presidential election. After the defeat of Senator George McGovern in 1972, Wattenberg helped found the Coalition for a Democratic Majority which focused on pocketbook issues and centrist themes to move the party back to the center.

In 1978, Wattenberg was sponsored by the American Enterprise Institute (AEI) in Washington, D.C., to publish the magazine Public Opinion. His 1984 book, The Good News Is the Bad News Is Wrong, suggested that the United States was not as troubled as the media and liberals proclaimed, despite economic and social upheaval. Wattenberg's 1987 book, The Birth Dearth, was cited in a contemporary review as a "fascinating and frightening book" with the reviewer noting that the book has "humorous passages, but that "[t]he only trouble is that this humor is sometimes unintentional." The book was cited by anti-racism activist Jane Elliott as a suggested book for learning about the problems of racism. In an interview, Elliott stated the central tenet of the book as "[t]he main problem confronting the United States these days is that there aren’t enough white babies being born" and that "[h]e says if we don’t change this and change it rapidly, white people will lose their numerical majority in this country and this will no longer be a white man’s land"; in another interview in 2022, Fern Schumer Chapman, who reviewed the book when first released, later called it "outrageous", that Wattenberg "worried that America would no longer be characterized as a nation that is predominately of white European extraction", and stated that "[l]ooking back, I believe he launched the white nationalist movement." Later liberal and progressive writers have also attributed the book's focus on white population as part of a larger belief in white supremacy, and of a larger "white extinction anxiety" to justify anti-abortion legislation.

In 1995, his book Values Matter Most drew the attention of President Bill Clinton which examined how centralist themes of the Republican party had helped win congressional victories of 1994. The publication also expressed concern at the waning of American values both abroad and at home but felt that the government could help cure the "culture of irresponsibility". In 1996, Henry Louis Gates Jr., referred to the book as "the book that prompted Clinton’s infamous midnight-of-the-soul telephone call to the author." As a senior fellow at AEI, he wrote The First Measured Century in 2001 with Theodore Caplow and Louis Hicks. His published works helped popularize the term "psephology", the study of elections. He is credited with the introduction of the term “social issues” to the political lexicon.

=== Television commentator ===
Wattenberg was the host of a number of PBS television specials, including Values Matter Most, The Grandchild Gap, America's Number One, Ben Wattenberg's 1980, The Stockholder Society, A Third Choice (about the role of third parties in American politics), Heaven on Earth: The Rise and Fall of Socialism, and The Democrats. He hosted the weekly PBS television program, Think Tank with Ben Wattenberg, from 1994 to 2010, and previously hosted PBS series In Search of the Real America and Ben Wattenberg At Large.

== Personal life ==
Wattenberg was the son of real-estate attorney Judah Wattenberg and Rachel Gutman Wattenberg. He was the younger brother of actress Rebecca Schull. He had four children, Ruth, Daniel and Sarah with his first wife, the former Marna Hade who died in 1997, and Rachel with his second wife, Diane Abelman. Wattenberg died on June 28, 2015, from complications following surgery.

== Bibliography ==
- This U.S.A., 1965
- The Real Majority: An Extraordinary Examination of the American Electorate, 1970
- The Real America, 1974
- Against All Enemies: A Novel, co-authored with Ervin S. Duggan 1977
- The Good News is, the Bad News is Wrong, 1984
- The Birth Dearth, 1987
- The First Universal Nation, 1991
- Values Matter Most, 1995
- The First Measured Century: An Illustrated Guide to Trends in America 1900–2000, co-authored with Theodore Caplow and Louis Hicks, 2000
- Fewer: How the New Demography of Depopulation Will Shape Our Future, 2004
- Fighting Words: A Tale of How Liberals Created Neo-Conservatism, 2008

== Filmography ==
- Heaven on Earth: The Rise and Fall of Socialism (2005)
