= Presidency of John Tyler =

U.S. presidential administration from 1841 to 1845

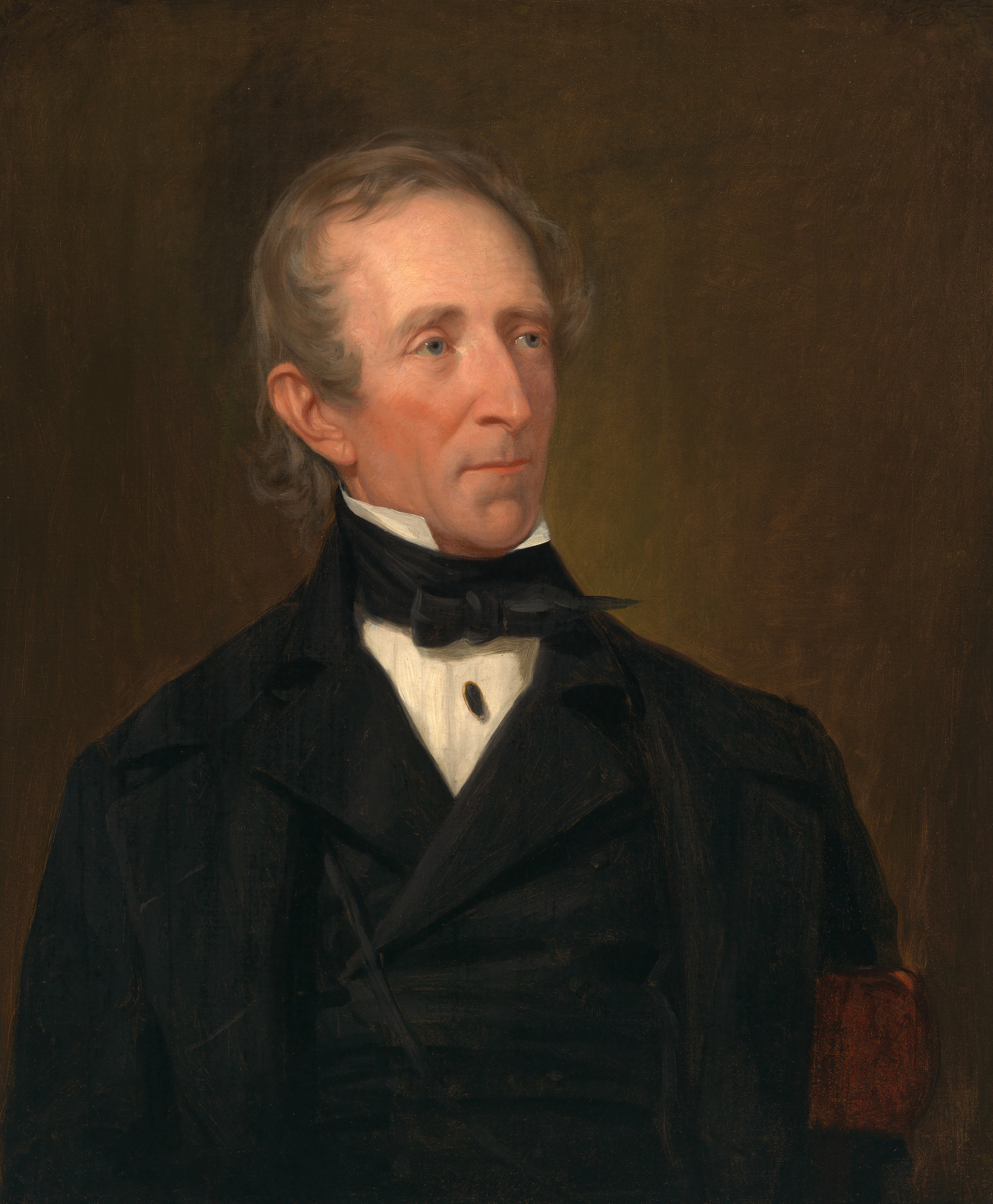
- Portrait, c. 1842
- Presidency of John Tyler; April 4, 1841 – March 4, 1845
- Vice President: None (Note: Tyler was vice president under President William Henry Harrison and became president upon Harrison's death on April 4, 1841. This was before the adoption of the Twenty-fifth Amendment in 1967, and a vacancy in the office of vice president was not filled until the next ensuing election and inauguration.)
- Cabinet: See list
- Party: Whig (1841); Independent (1841–1844); Tyler Party (1844); Independent (1844–1845)
- Seat: White House
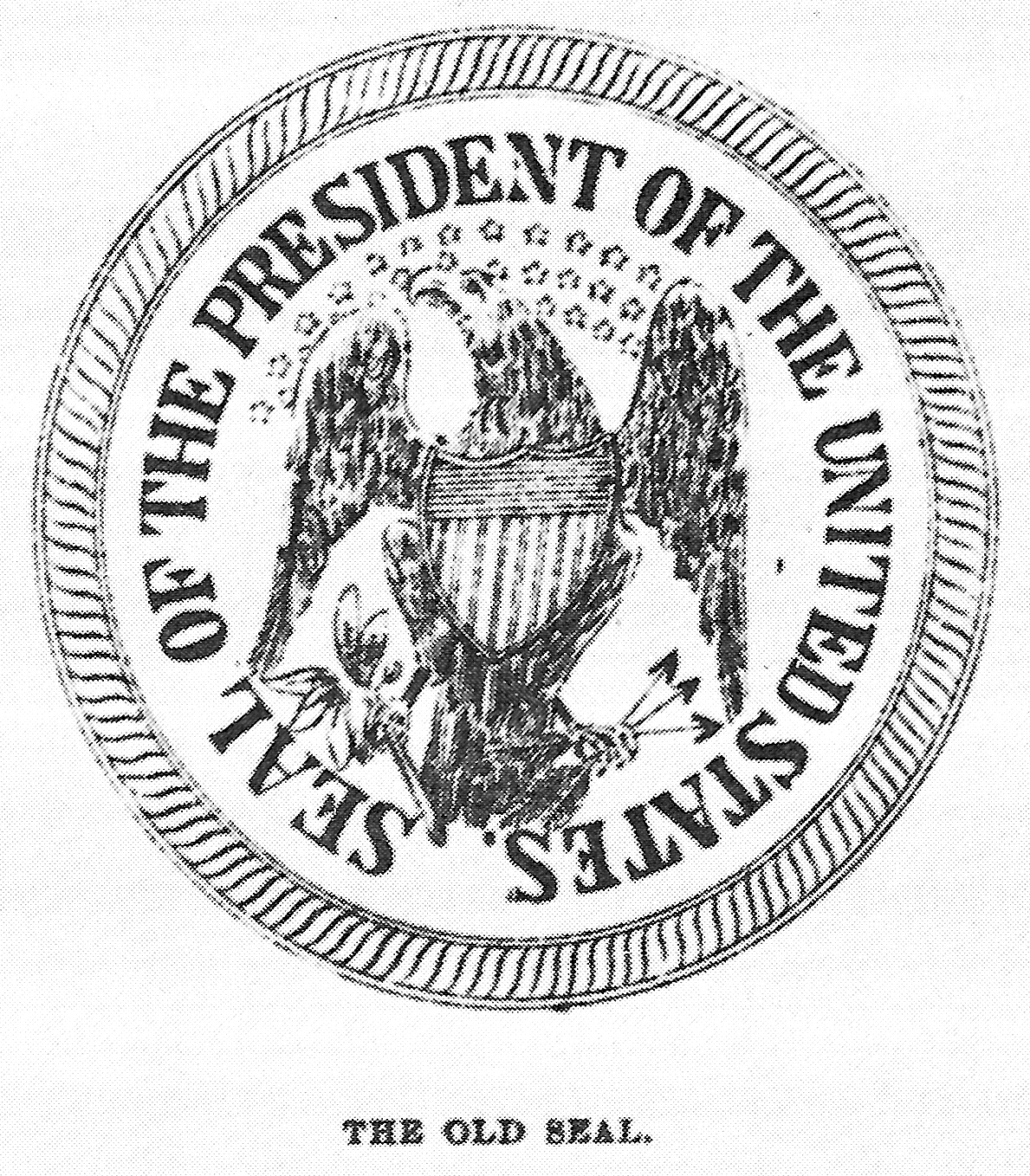
- Seal of the president (1840–1850)

John Tyler's tenure as the tenth president of the United States began on April 4, 1841, after the death of President William Henry Harrison, and ended on March 4, 1845. He had been Vice President of the United States for only 31 days when he assumed the presidency. Tyler was the first to succeed to the office without being elected to it. To forestall constitutional uncertainty, Tyler took the presidential oath of office on April 6. He then moved into the White House, assumed full presidential powers, and served out the balance of Harrison's four-year term, setting the Tyler Precedent that would govern future extraordinary successions and eventually become codified in the Twenty-fifth Amendment. He was succeeded by James K. Polk of the Democratic Party.

Although nominated for the vice presidency on the Whig Party ticket in 1840, Tyler did not share the views held by some members of his party on various issues. That did not, however, become a problem until after the 1840 election, because during that campaign, the party had not taken clear stands on specific issues such as a national bank and protective tariff. Instead, it had emphasized attacking incumbent Democratic President Martin Van Buren and proclaiming colorful slogans about log cabins and hard cider. After the election, however, as a strict constructionist, Tyler found some of the program then introduced by the Whigs in Congress unconstitutional and thus vetoed several bills favored by party leader Henry Clay. Among the bills vetoed by Tyler was a measure to re-establish a national bank. In response to these vetoes, most of Tyler's cabinet resigned, and Whig congressmen expelled Tyler from the party. A resolution calling for his impeachment was introduced in the House, though it was later defeated. Despite his disagreements with Congress, Tyler did sign the Tariff of 1842, which provided needed revenue to a government still dealing with the effects of the Panic of 1837.

Tyler had more success in international affairs. His administration negotiated the Webster–Ashburton Treaty, which settled a contentious territorial dispute with the United Kingdom. Tyler also emphasized American interests in the Pacific Ocean, and he reached a commercial treaty with Qing China, known as the Treaty of Whangia. He also extended the principles of the Monroe Doctrine to Hawaii, in a policy that became known as the "Tyler Doctrine." During his last two years in office Tyler pressed for the annexation of Texas, thereby introducing the annexation issue into the 1844 presidential election, and initially ran for a full term, under the banner of the Tyler Party. Because of his injection of that issue, pro-annexation Democrats blocked the renomination of former President Van Buren, who opposed annexation and nominated instead the previously little known James K. Polk. After Tyler withdrew from the race, he endorsed Polk for the presidency. Polk went on to defeat Clay, the Whig candidate, in the general election. On March 1, 1845, three days before turning the presidency over to Polk, Tyler signed a Texas annexation bill into law, and Texas would be admitted as a state in the first year of Polk's presidency.

Tyler's presidency has provoked highly divided responses, but he is generally held in low esteem by historians. Edward P. Crapol began his biography John Tyler, the Accidental President (2006) by noting: "Other biographers and historians have argued that John Tyler was a hapless and inept chief executive whose presidency was seriously flawed." In The Republican Vision of John Tyler (2003), Dan Monroe observed that the Tyler presidency "is generally ranked as one of the least successful". But both of those authors used those statements as a preface to their presenting a more balanced view of Tyler's presidency. Some historians and commentators have praised Tyler's foreign policy, personal conduct, and the precedent he set with regards to presidential succession.

== Accession ==
In the 1840 presidential election, the Whig ticket of William Henry Harrison and John Tyler defeated the Democratic ticket led by incumbent President Martin Van Buren. Tyler was sworn in as the nation's 10th vice president on March 4, 1841. Following Harrison's two-hour speech on a cold and overcast March 4, the vice president returned to the Senate to receive the president's cabinet nominations, presiding over the confirmations the following day. Expecting few responsibilities, he then left Washington for his home in Williamsburg. After his inauguration, Harrison called for a special session of Congress, to begin in late May, in order to address the dangerous financial condition of a country still in the midst of the Panic of 1837. The first few weeks of the presidency took a toll on Harrison's health, and after being caught in a rainstorm in late March he came down with pneumonia and pleurisy. Harrison's old age and fading health were no secret during the campaign, and the question of the presidential succession was on every politician's mind.

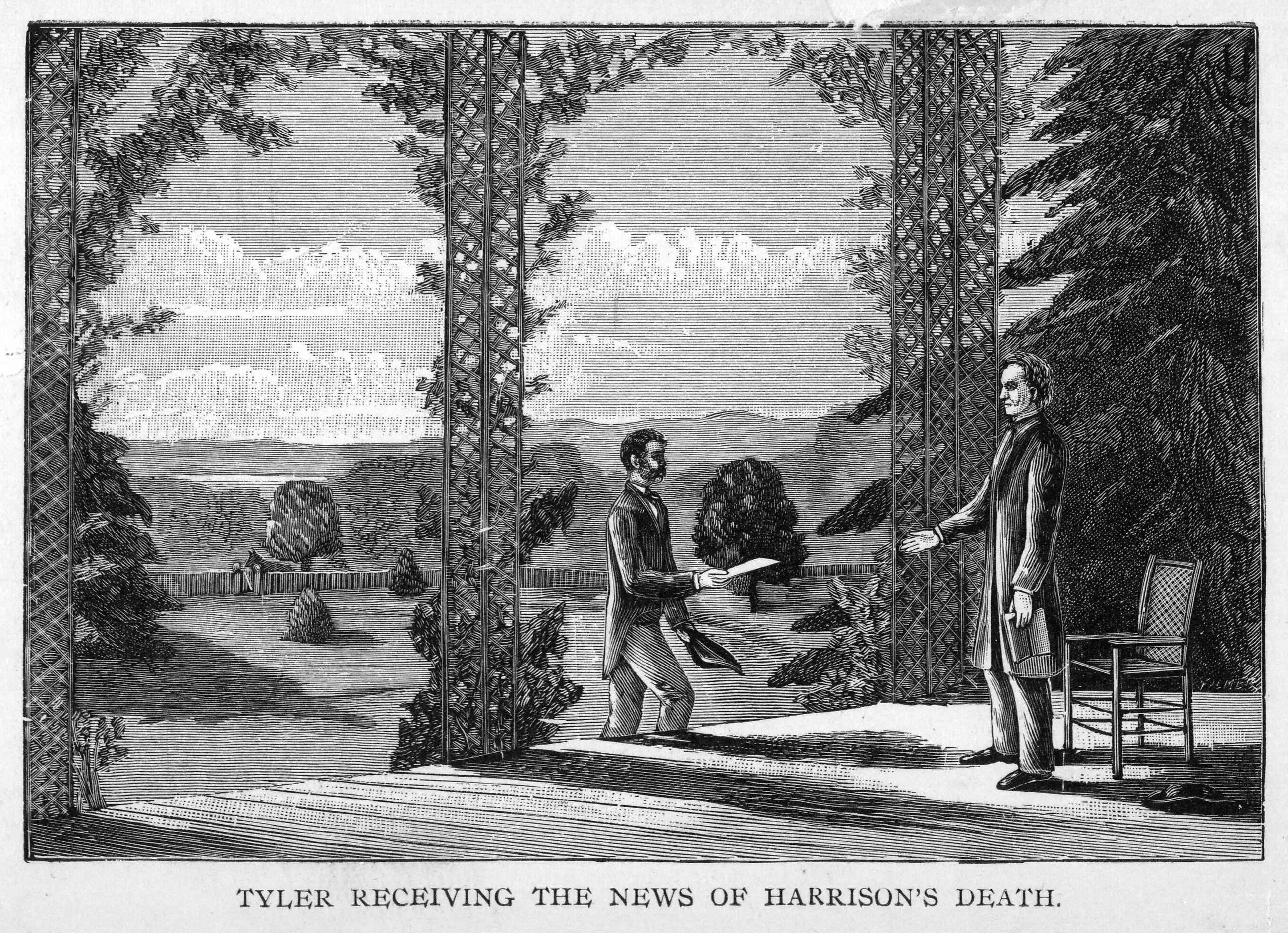
1888 illustration of President Tyler receiving the news of President Harrison's death from Chief Clerk of the State Department Fletcher Webster

Secretary of State Daniel Webster sent word to Tyler of Harrison's illness on April 1, and on April 5, Tyler learned that Harrison had died on the preceding day. Harrison's death while in office was an unprecedented event that caused considerable uncertainty regarding presidential succession. Legal scholars had long anticipated that a president would die in office at some point, but no firm consensus existed as to whether or not the vice president would fully assume the office of the presidency. Article II, Section 1, Clause 6 of the United States Constitution, which governed intra-term presidential succession at the time states that:

In Case of the Removal of the President from Office, or of his Death, Resignation, or Inability to discharge the Powers and Duties of the said Office, the Same shall devolve on the Vice President,

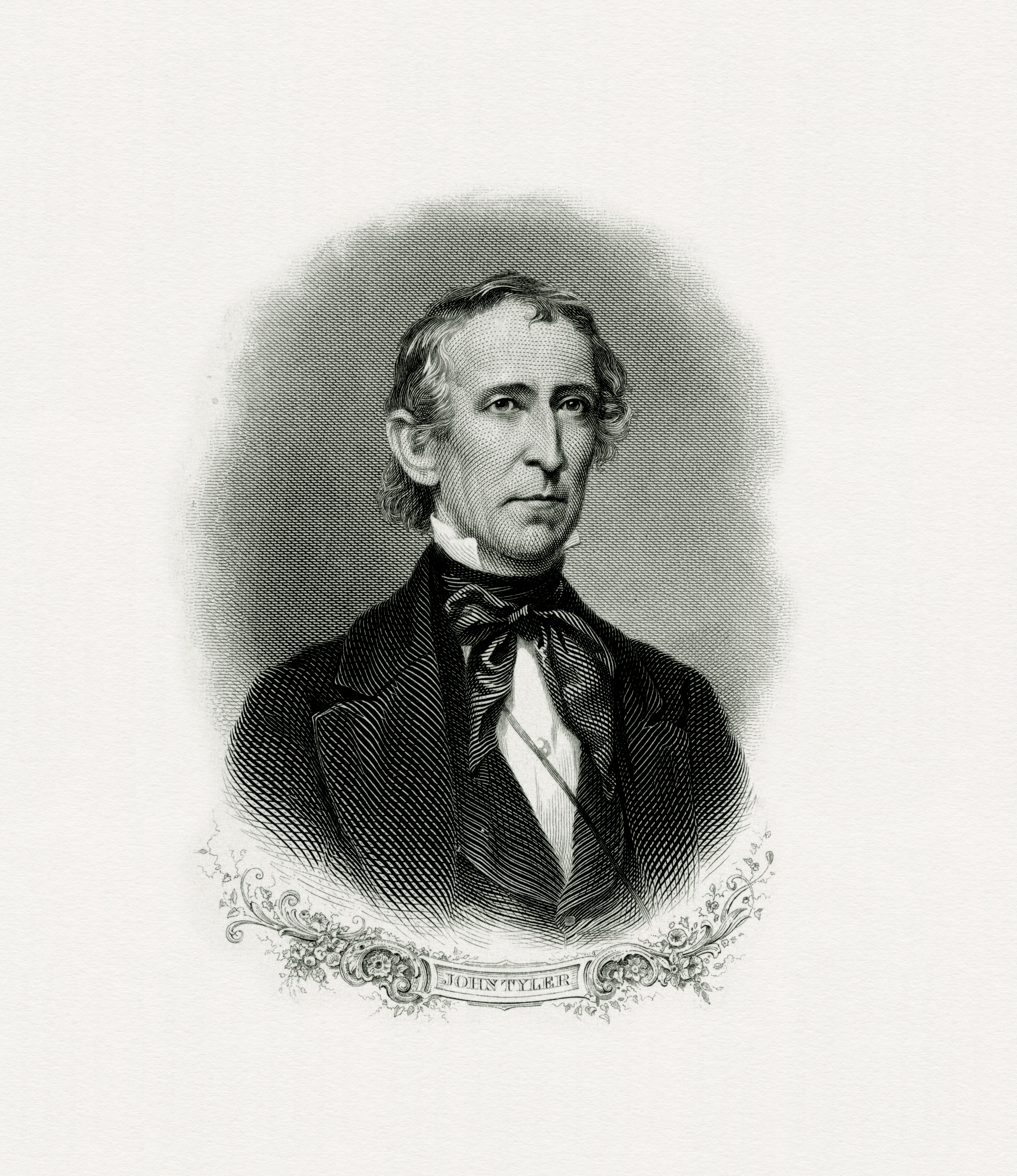
BEP engraved portrait of Tyler as president.

The text of this Constitutional prescription led to the question of whether the actual office of president, or merely the president's powers and duties, devolved upon Vice President Tyler. The cabinet met within an hour of Harrison's death and, according to a later account, determined that Tyler would be "vice-president acting President". But Tyler firmly and decisively asserted that the Constitution gave him the full and unqualified powers of the office. Accordingly, he had himself sworn in immediately as president, moved into the White House and assumed full presidential powers. This set the critical Tyler Precedent for an orderly transfer of power following a president's death, though it was not codified until the passage of the 25th Amendment in 1967. The presidential oath was administered by Chief Judge William Cranch of the U.S. Circuit Court of the District of Columbia in Tyler's hotel room. Tyler had initially questioned the necessity of taking the oath, arguing that it was redundant to his oath as vice president, but agreed to it in order to quell any doubt over his accession.

Tyler delivered an inaugural address before Congress on April 9, in which he reasserted his belief in fundamental tenets of Jeffersonian democracy and limited federal power. Tyler's claim to be president was resisted by many members of Congress. Representative (and former president) John Quincy Adams felt that Tyler should be a caretaker under the title of "acting president", or remain vice president in name. Also among those who questioned Tyler's authority was Senator Henry Clay, who had planned to be "the real power behind a fumbling throne" while Harrison was alive, and intended the same for Tyler. Clay saw Tyler as the "vice-president" and his presidency as a mere "regency".

After some heated debate, Congress confirmed Tyler's interpretation that he was, indeed, the new president. In both houses, unsuccessful amendments were offered to strike the word "president" in favor of language including the term "vice president" to refer to Tyler. Mississippi Senator Robert J. Walker, in opposition, stated that the idea that Tyler was still vice president and could preside over the Senate was absurd. Tyler never wavered from his conviction that he was the rightful president; when his political opponents sent correspondence to the White House addressed to the "vice president" or "acting president", Tyler had it returned unopened.

== Administration ==
Tyler cabinet
Office	Name	Term
President	John Tyler	1841–1845
Vice President	Vacant	1841–1845
Secretary of State	Daniel Webster	1841–1843
Abel P. Upshur	1843–1844
John C. Calhoun	1844–1845
Secretary of the Treasury	Thomas Ewing	1841
Walter Forward	1841–1843
John Canfield Spencer	1843–1844
George M. Bibb	1844–1845
Secretary of War	John Bell	1841
John Canfield Spencer	1841–1843
James Madison Porter	1843–1844
William Wilkins	1844–1845
Attorney General	John J. Crittenden	1841
Hugh S. Legaré	1841–1843
John Nelson	1843–1845
Postmaster General	Francis Granger	1841
Charles A. Wickliffe	1841–1845
Secretary of the Navy	George Edmund Badger	1841
Abel P. Upshur	1841–1843
David Henshaw	1843–1844
Thomas Walker Gilmer	1844
John Y. Mason	1844–1845

Fearing that he would alienate Harrison's supporters, Tyler decided to keep the dead president's entire cabinet even though several members were openly hostile to him and resented his assumption of the office. At his first cabinet meeting, Tyler was informed that Harrison had let major policy decisions be resolved by a majority vote, and that the cabinet expected the new president to continue this practice. Tyler was astounded and immediately corrected them:

I beg your pardon, gentlemen; I am very glad to have in my Cabinet such able statesmen as you have proved yourselves to be. And I shall be pleased to avail myself of your counsel and advice. But I can never consent to being dictated to as to what I shall or shall not do. I, as president, shall be responsible for my administration. I hope to have your hearty co-operation in carrying out its measures. So long as you see fit to do this, I shall be glad to have you with me. When you think otherwise, your resignations will be accepted.

With the exception of Secretary of State Webster, the new president had no allies in the cabinet, and moreover soon discovered that he had few in Congress either. Adhering to his states' rights, strict-constructionist ideology and having joined the Whigs only in opposition to Andrew Jackson, he did not embrace the American System of internal improvements, protective tariffs, and national bank proposals of the party leaders. Following Tyler's veto of two Whig banking bills, in September 1841 all the members of the cabinet except Webster resigned in protest, a maneuver that Clay had engineered. Having suspected that much of the cabinet would resign, Tyler quickly put together a new cabinet consisting of Whigs opposed to Clay.

Webster had long struggled with his role in the Whig Party and the Tyler administration, and he finally resigned from the cabinet in May 1843. Abel Upshur replaced Webster as Secretary of State, and he focused on Tyler's priority of annexing the Republic of Texas. In hopes of building up his own party of Southern Whigs and Northern Democrats, the Tyler administration removed several other important officials in favor of "Tyler Men." One of these supposed loyalists, Thomas Gilmer, replaced Upshur as Secretary of the Navy. The shakeup left Tyler's cabinet composed equally of Democrats and Whigs. Many of Tyler's later appointments, including Upshur and Gilmer, were followers of Senator John C. Calhoun of South Carolina; unknown to Tyler, their actions were calculated to boost Calhoun's 1844 presidential candidacy. After Upshur and Gilmer were both killed in a naval accident in early 1844, Tyler brought in Calhoun as Secretary of State and John Y. Mason of Virginia as Secretary of the Navy. Later that year, Secretary of the Treasury John C. Spencer left the cabinet and was replaced by George M. Bibb, leaving Tyler's cabinet with just one Northerner, Secretary of War William Wilkins.

Tyler was the first president to have his cabinet nominees rejected by the Senate. The four rejected nominees were Caleb Cushing (Treasury), David Henshaw (Navy), James Porter (War), and James S. Green (Treasury). Henshaw and Porter served as recess appointees before their rejections. Tyler repeatedly renominated Cushing, who was rejected three times in one day, March 3, 1843, the last full day of the 27th Congress. After the end of Tyler's term, a cabinet nominee would not again be rejected by the Senate until the 1860s.

Tyler's wife Letitia Christian Tyler was an invalid who died in 1842. His daughter-in-law, Priscilla Cooper Tyler, acted as the surrogate hostess and first lady at the White House until he married Julia Gardiner Tyler in June 1844.

== Judicial appointments ==
As they did with his cabinet nominees, Tyler's opponents repeatedly thwarted his judicial nominations. Two vacancies occurred on the Supreme Court during Tyler's presidency, as Justices Smith Thompson and Henry Baldwin died in 1843 and 1844, respectively. Tyler, ever at odds with Congress, put forward five men for Supreme Court confirmation a total of nine times. John C. Spencer, Reuben Walworth, Edward King all had their nominations scuttled more than once, and the full Senate never acted on John M. Read's nomination. The Whig-controlled Senate rejected Tyler's nominees in part because they wanted to leave the seats open for the next president, who they hoped would be Henry Clay.

Finally, on February 14, 1845, with less than a month remaining in his term, Tyler's nomination of Samuel Nelson to Thompson's seat was confirmed by the Senate. Nelson, a Democrat, had a reputation as a careful and noncontroversial jurist. Still, his confirmation came as a surprise. He would serve on the Supreme Court until 1872. Baldwin's seat remained vacant until James K. Polk's nominee, Robert Grier, was confirmed August 4, 1846. Tyler made six other successful nominations to the federal bench while in office, all to federal district courts.

== Economic policy and party conflicts ==
=== Whig policies ===
President Harrison had been expected to adhere closely to Whig Party policies and to defer to congressional leaders, particularly Clay. Though he would clash with Whig leaders over other policies, Tyler assented to parts of the Whig legislative program, including repeal of the Independent Treasury that had been created under President Van Buren. Tyler also signed the Preemption Act of 1841, which was designed to facilitate settlement of the West. The act allowed settlers to buy 160 acre plots of land in the West without having to compete for the land in an auction. That same act included a distribution program in which states received revenue from the land sales through which they could fund infrastructure projects and make other investments. At Tyler's insistence, the distribution program would only remain in effect if tariff rates were kept below 20 percent. Another Whig policy, the Bankruptcy Act of 1841, signed into law by Tyler, allowed individuals to declare bankruptcy. The act was the first law in U.S. history that allowed for voluntary bankruptcy.

=== National bank ===
Once Congress voted to repeal the Independent Treasury, the Whigs turned their attention to the creation of a restored national bank, which they hoped would replace the Independent Treasury as the depository of government funds. The federal charter of the Second Bank of the United States had expired after Andrew Jackson vetoed a bill to re-charter it, and Clay made the establishment of a new national bank the centerpiece of his legislative agenda. Clay's advocacy was motivated in part by the poor economic conditions inherited from the Van Buren administration; he and his allies argued that the re-establishment of a national bank would help lift the economy. Despite Tyler's long-standing opposition to the national bank, Clay was determined to enact his American System into law with the Whig congressional majority.

In June 1841, Treasury Secretary Thomas Ewing proposed a national bank bill that reflected Tyler's strict construction of the Constitution; the bank would be headquartered in Washington, D.C., with branches only in those states that consented to the bank's presence. Clay dismissed the Tyler administration's proposal, and promoted his own legislation that would allow the bank to operate with or without the consent of states. Clay's bill passed Congress on August 6, and Tyler vetoed the bill on August 16. Not only did Tyler think that the bill was unconstitutional, but he also came to view the struggle over the national bank as a personal struggle between himself and Clay, with control of the country at stake. In reaction to the veto, numerous Whigs and Whig newspapers denounced Tyler.

Tyler agreed to support an effort to craft a compromise bank bill that would meet his objections, and the cabinet developed another version of the bill. Congress passed a bill expected to be based on Treasury Secretary Ewing's proposal, but when it appeared that the final version had been altered into something different, possibly to thwart the president, Tyler vetoed that bill as well. Tyler's second veto infuriated Whigs throughout the country, inspiring numerous anti-Tyler rallies and angry letters to the White House. On September 11, members of the cabinet entered Tyler's office one by one and resigned—an orchestration by Clay to force Tyler's resignation and place his own lieutenant, Senate President pro tempore Samuel L. Southard, in the White House. The lone cabinet member who did not resign was Webster, who remained both to finalize what became the 1842 Webster–Ashburton Treaty and to demonstrate his independence from Clay. When told by Webster that he was willing to stay, Tyler is reported to have said, "Give me your hand on that, and now I will say to you that Henry Clay is a doomed man." On September 13, when the president did not resign or give in, the Whigs in Congress expelled Tyler from the party. Whigs in Congress were so angry with Tyler that they refused to allocate funds to fix the White House, which had fallen into disrepair.

As the Whigs had repealed the Independent Treasury but had been unable to craft a replacement, the federal government deposited its money in state-charted banks. Following a congressional recess, Tyler proposed the "Exchequer Plan" as a replacement for the national bank. The Exchequer Plan would establish a government agency overseen by presidential appointees that would store government funds and issue banknotes. Webster argued that the agency would be "the most beneficial measure of any sort ever adopted in this country, the Constitution only excepted." Despite Webster's enthusiasm, the plan was not seriously considered by Congress, as Whigs still wanted a national bank and Democrats favored the restoration of the Independent Treasury. In early 1842, Clay resigned from the Senate to focus on the upcoming presidential election. Following Clay's resignation, the idea for a new national bank lay dormant for the remainder of Tyler's presidency, and Congress moved on to other issues.

=== Tariff and distribution debate ===
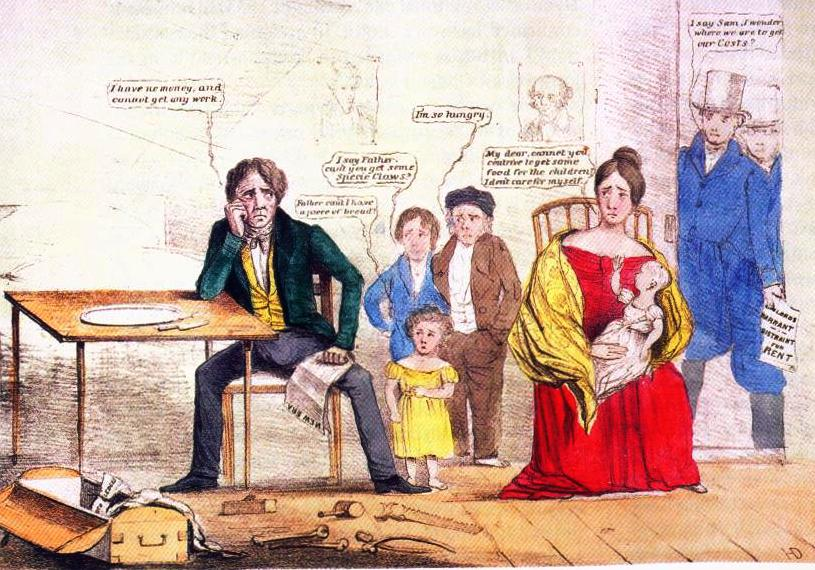
Whig cartoon depicting the effects of unemployment on a family that has Jackson's and Van Buren's portraits on the wall

Due to the ongoing economic troubles of the Panic of 1837, as well as the relatively low tariff rates set by the Tariff of 1833, the government faced a growing budget deficit. Congressional Whigs wanted to raise the tariff, both to provide federal revenue and to protect domestic industry. Yet Whig leaders also wanted to extend the distribution program, which was set to expire if tariff rates were raised above twenty percent. In June 1842, the Whig Congress passed two bills that would raise tariffs and unconditionally extend the distribution program. Believing it improper to continue distribution at a time when federal revenue shortage necessitated increasing the tariff, Tyler vetoed both bills, burning any remaining bridges between himself and the Whigs. Congress tried again, combining the two into one bill; Tyler vetoed it again, to the outrage of many in Congress, who nevertheless failed to override the veto. As some action was necessary to address the budget deficit, Whigs in Congress, led by the House Ways and Means Chairman Millard Fillmore, passed in each house by one vote a bill restoring tariffs to 1832 levels and ending the distribution program. Tyler signed the Tariff of 1842 on August 30, pocket vetoing a separate bill to restore distribution.

=== Impeachment proceedings ===
Shortly after the tariff vetoes, Whigs in the House of Representatives initiated American history's first official impeachment proceedings against a president. The Whig drive for impeachment was motivated by more than the difference of opinion over the tariff and other issues. Tyler's actions violated the Whig concept of the presidency, as party leaders believed the president should be deferential to Congress in regards to legislation and domestic policy. This view was at least partly rooted in how previous presidents had acted. Until the presidency of the Whigs' arch-enemy Andrew Jackson, presidents had rarely vetoed bills, and then, generally only on the grounds of whether or not the bill was unconstitutional.

In July 1842, Representative John Botts introduced a resolution levying several charges against Tyler and calling for a nine-member committee to investigate his behavior, with the expectation that this committee would issue a formal impeachment recommendation. Senator Clay found this measure prematurely aggressive, favoring a more moderate progression toward Tyler's "inevitable" impeachment. The Botts resolution was tabled until the following January, when it was rejected, 127−83. Despite the rejection of the Botts resolution, a House select committee, headed by John Quincy Adams, condemned the president's use of the veto and assailed his character. The committee published a report that did not formally recommend impeachment, but clearly established the possibility for impeachment proceedings. In August 1842, by a vote of 98–90, the House endorsed the committee's report. Adams also sponsored a constitutional amendment to make it easier for Congress to override vetoes, but neither house passed such a measure. Ultimately, the Whigs failed to impeach Tyler, since they believed that his likely acquittal would devastate the party.

=== 1842 mid-term elections ===
The Whigs lost numerous races in the 1842 mid-term elections, as the country continued to suffer from the effects of the Panic of 1837. The Whigs had promised "relief and reform," and voters punished the party for the lack of change. Democrats took control of the House, and Tyler felt vindicated by the defeat of the congressional Whigs. Both parties, intent on electing their own candidates in the 1844 election, largely continued to oppose Tyler. No major legislation would pass in the lame duck session of the 27th Congress or in the 28th Congress. Near the end of Tyler's term in office, on March 3, 1845, Congress overrode his veto of a minor bill relating to revenue cutters. This was the first successful override of any presidential veto in U.S. history.

== Foreign and military affairs ==
According to Edward Crapol, Tyler had an aggressive and successful foreign policy, centered on national expansion. He states that Tyler's:

foreign policy agenda was neither narrowly proslavery nor solely tied to the ascendancy of the South in the Union. Tyler envisaged a comprehensive foreign policy that would provide mutual, if not equal, benefits to all sections. He was a disciple of Madison and Jefferson in his belief that territorial and commercial expansion would allay sectional differences, preserve the Union, and create a nation of power and glory unparalleled in history.

=== Relations with Britain ===
==== Webster–Ashburton Treaty ====
With his domestic agenda frustrated in Congress, Tyler worked with Secretary of State Webster to pursue an ambitious foreign policy. Webster sought to conclude a major treaty with Great Britain to bring an end to simmering tensions between the two countries. Anglo-American diplomatic relations had reached a low point in the aftermath of the Caroline affair and the Aroostook War of the late 1830s. Webster and other Whig leaders favored closer relations with Britain in order to spur British investment in the ailing U.S. economy, while Tyler pursued a conciliatory policy with the British in order to win their acquiescence to the U.S. annexation of Texas. As part of this conciliatory policy, the Tyler administration launched a secret propaganda campaign to influence public opinion in favor of an Anglo-American treaty that would settle the border between Maine and Canada. That issue, which had not been settled in the Treaty of Paris or the Treaty of Ghent, had strained relations between the United States and Britain for decades.

British diplomat Lord Ashburton arrived in Washington in April 1842, and after months of negotiations the United States and Britain agreed to the Webster–Ashburton Treaty in August 1842. Delegates from Maine, who had been invited by Webster to ensure that state's support, somewhat reluctantly agreed to support the treaty. The treaty clearly delineated Maine's Northern border, as well as other sections of the U.S.-Canada border that had been in dispute. The treaty also included a pledge by the United States to step up enforcement against the Atlantic slave trade.

Senator Thomas Hart Benton led Senate opposition to the treaty, arguing that it "needlessly and shamelessly" relinquished American territory, but few others joined Benton in resisting the treaty. The Webster–Ashburton Treaty won Senate ratification in a 39-to-9 vote, and it became popular among Americans, although few from either party gave Tyler credit for it. The treaty represented an important point in the growing warmth of Anglo-American relations after the War of 1812, as it showed that both countries accepted joint control of North America. American expansionists would instead focus on Mexico, while the British government under Robert Peel was freed to turn its attention to domestic and European issues.

==== Oregon ====
To guarantee a major American role on the West Coast, Tyler sought a treaty with the British regarding the partition of Oregon Country. The two countries had peacefully jointly claimed the unsettled region since the signing of the Treaty of 1818. Britain and the United States had intermittently engaged in discussions over a partition of the territory, but had been unable to come to an agreement. The British favored extending the U.S.-Canadian border west along the 49th parallel north until it met the Columbia River, at which point that river would serve as the boundary. For the U.S., a major goal was the acquisition of a deepwater port site in the Puget Sound; the lone deepwater port site in the region lay north of the Columbia River but south of the 49th parallel. Tyler also believed that the acquisition of part of the territory would help make the simultaneous annexation of Texas more palatable to Northerners. As more and more Americans traveled along the Oregon Trail to settle in Oregon Country, the status of the territory became an increasingly important issue. Some Americans, like Charles Wilkes of the United States Exploring Expedition, favored claiming the entire territory, which extended up to the 54°40′ parallel.

Tyler's enthusiasm for an agreement with Britain regarding Oregon was not shared by Upshur and Calhoun, both of whom focused on the annexation of Texas. Acquisition of the territory would become a major campaign issue in the 1844 election, with many expansionists calling for expansion of the entire territory. In 1846, the United States and Britain would come to an agreement to partition Oregon along the lines that had been advocated by Tyler.

=== Pacific ===
The return of the United States Exploring Expedition in 1842 stimulated American interest in trade with China. Tyler sought to establish an American harbor on the Pacific Ocean, but his administration was unable to establish undisputed control of suitable location. Webster attempted to convince the British to pressure Mexico to sell San Francisco, but neither the British nor the Mexicans were interested in this proposal.

Previous administrations had shown little interest in the Hawaiian Islands, but American missionaries had successfully converted many of the inhabitants. American traders based in Honolulu had become influential in the Hawaiian Kingdom, which held a key location in Pacific trade. At Webster's urging, Tyler announced in 1842 that Washington would oppose colonization of the Kingdom by any European power. This policy, which effectively extended the Monroe Doctrine to Hawaii, became known as the Tyler Doctrine.

Eager to compete with Great Britain in international markets, Tyler sent lawyer Caleb Cushing to China, where Cushing negotiated the terms of the 1844 Treaty of Wanghia. The treaty, which was the first bilateral accord between the United States and China, contributed to greatly expanded trade between the two countries in subsequent years.

=== Dorr Rebellion ===
Tyler was called upon to use the army to suppress a popular rebellion against the state government in Rhode Island called the Dorr Rebellion. He did not send it in. Unlike most other states, by the early 1840s Rhode Island had not extended voting rights to all adult white men. Reformers like Thomas Dorr became increasingly dissatisfied and sought a constitutional convention to update the Rhode Island Royal Charter of 1663, which continued to act as the state's constitution. In the 1830s, Dorr, a Rhode Island state legislator, had formed a third party that called for universal manhood suffrage. In early 1842, Dorr established a rival government to that of Governor Samuel Ward King after a contested gubernatorial election.

As the Dorr Rebellion came to a head in 1842, Tyler pondered the request of the governor and legislature to send federal troops to help it suppress the insurgents. Tyler called for calm on both sides, and recommended that the governor enlarge the franchise to let most men vote. Tyler promised that in case an actual insurrection should break out in Rhode Island he would employ force to aid the regular, or Charter, government. He made it clear that federal assistance would be given, not to prevent, but only to put down insurrection, and would not be available until violence had been committed. After listening to reports from his confidential agents, Tyler decided that the 'lawless assemblages' had dispersed and expressed his confidence in a "temper of conciliation as well as of energy and decision." In the end, it was not necessary for him to send any federal forces; the rebels fled the state when the state militia marched against them, but the incident led to broader suffrage in Rhode Island nonetheless.

=== Other issues ===
John Tyler Indian peace medal

Tyler and Secretary of the Navy Upshur advocated increased funding for and reforms to the navy so that it could protect American trade in both the Atlantic and Pacific Oceans. Many of Upshur's proposals, including the expansion of the naval officer corps and the establishment of a naval academy, were defeated in Congress. Upshur did preside over the conversion of many ships to steam power and helped establish the United States Naval Observatory. Upshur also initiated the construction of the navy's first screw steam warship, the USS Princeton.

Tyler brought the long, bloody Second Seminole War in Florida to an end in 1842, and expressed interest in the forced cultural assimilation of the Native Americans. On March 3, 1845, Florida became the 27th state, as Tyler signed legislation admitting into the Union.

Henry Wheaton, the minister to Prussia (1835–1846) negotiated a commercial reciprocity treaty with the German Zollverein, or economic union. The union covered Prussia and eighteen smaller states. The treaty called for a reciprocal lowering of tariffs, especially on American tobacco and cotton and on German lard and manufactured items. All the members of the Zollverein assented to the treaty, and it was signed on March 25, 1844. However the Senate Committee on Foreign Relations reported, June 14, 1844, against ratification and it never went into effect. The treaty was considered at the same time that the Senate debated a treaty to annex Texas, and the hostile Whig Senate refused to ratify either treaty. Senators disliked having tariff rates fixed by treaty rather than by legislation. Britain lobbied against it and Prussia lacked a diplomat in Washington. President Tyler was unpopular, and some American mercantile interests were opposed.

== Frémont expeditions (1842 and 1843–1844) ==
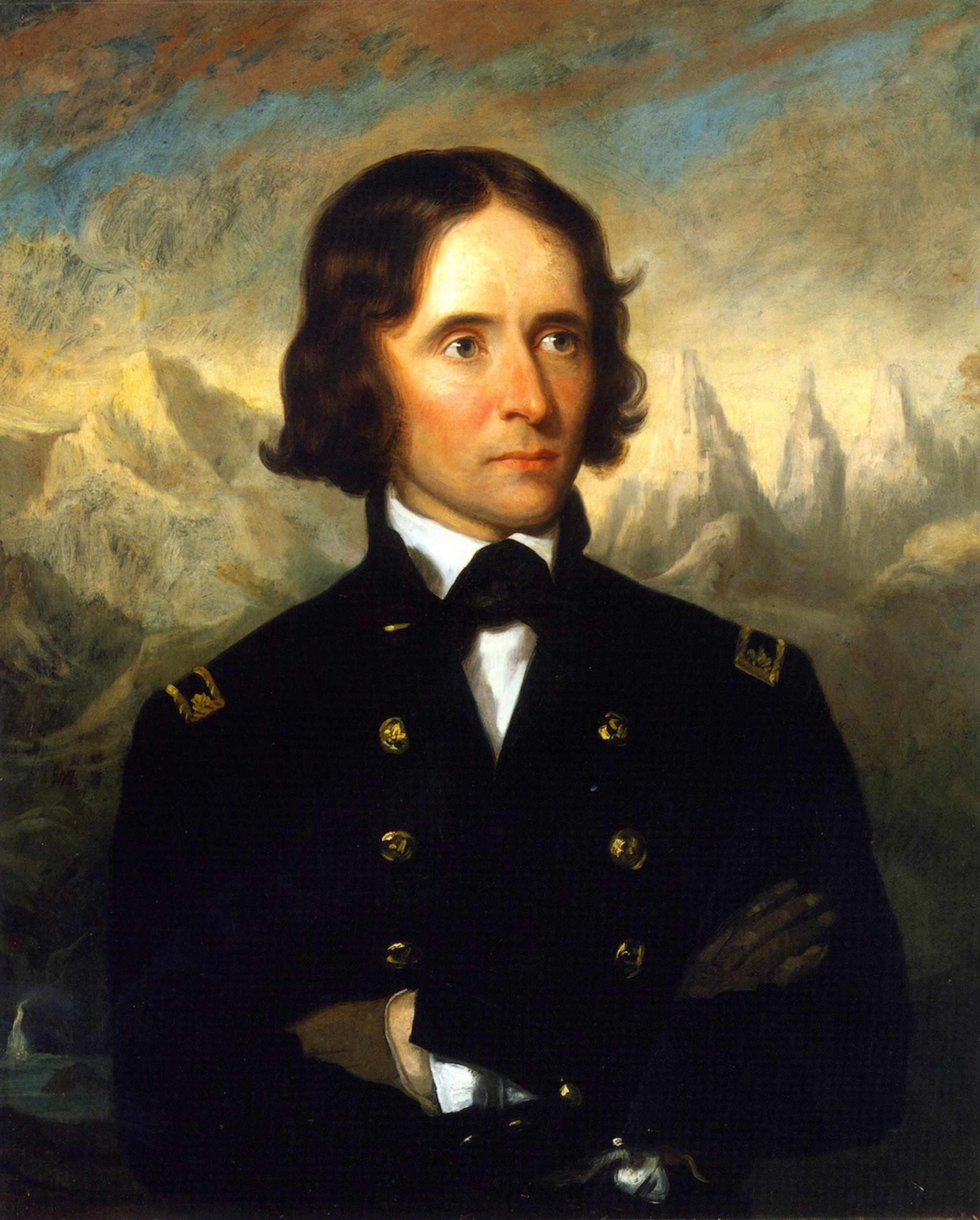
Captain John C. Frémont's expeditions (1842 and 1843–1844) under Tyler's presidency opened the West to American emigration.

Tyler's presidency had popular successes in western exploration. Captain John C. Frémont completed two interior scientific expeditions (1842 and 1843–1844), which opened the West to American emigration. Tyler himself had an interest in the vast territory west of the Rockies known as Oregon, which extended from the northern boundary of California to the southern boundary of Alaska. At this time Britain and the United States shared Oregon by joint occupation, according to the Convention of 1818. Mexico was the traditional owner of land south of Oregon, including California. In 1841, Tyler had urged Congress to establish a chain of American forts from Council Bluffs, Iowa to the Pacific. Tyler did not want to antagonize Great Britain or Mexico, so the official purpose of Frémont's expeditions under Tyler was only to gather scientific information. The two expeditions under Frémont, however, were to notify Great Britain and Mexico, the intentions of the United States were to expand to the Pacific Ocean.

During the summer of 1842, Major Frémont began his first expedition and was to explore the Wind River of the Rocky Mountains, examine the Oregon Trail through the South Pass, and report on the rivers and the fertility of the lands, find optimal sites for forts and describe the mountains beyond in Wyoming. Frémont and his party of 25 men, including mountain man Kit Carson, embarked from the Kansas River on June 15, 1842, following the Platte River to the South Pass, and starting from Green River he explored the Wind River Range. Frémont climbed a 13,745-foot mountain, Frémont's Peak, planted an American flag, claiming the Rocky Mountains and the West for the United States. Frémont's five-month exploration, however, was a success, returning to Washington in October.

During the summer of 1843, Frémont started his second expedition. Frémont and his almost 40 well-equipped men left the Missouri River in May after he controversially obtained a 12-pound howitzer cannon in St. Louis. Frémont invited Carson on the second expedition, due to his proven skills, and Carson joined Frémont's party on the Arkansas River. Frémont took to the regular Oregon Trail. His party stopped to explore the northern part of the Great Salt Lake, then traveled by way Fort Hall and Fort Boise to Marcus Whitman's mission, along the Snake River to the Columbia River and into Oregon. Traveling west along the Columbia, Frémont and his party came within sight of the Cascade Range peaks and mapped Mount St. Helens and Mount Hood. Reaching the Dalles on November 5, Frémont left his party and traveled to the British-held Fort Vancouver for supplies.

Rather than turning around and heading back to St. Louis, Frémont resolved to explore the Great Basin between the Rockies and the Sierras Frémont and his party turned south along the eastern flank of the Cascades through the Oregon territory to Pyramid Lake, which he named. Looping back to the east to stay on the eastern side of the Sierra Nevada mountain range, they turned south again reaching the Carson River on January 18, 1844. Frémont turned west into the cold and snowy Sierra Nevada, becoming one of the first Americans to see Lake Tahoe. Carson successfully led Frémont's party through a new pass over the high Sierras, which Frémont named Carson Pass in his honor. Frémont and his party then descended the American River valley to Sutter's Fort in early March.

Leaving Sutter's Fort, Frémont and his men headed south on the eastern edge of the San Joaquin Valley until he struck the "Spanish Trail" between Los Angeles and Santa Fe, and headed east through Tehachapi Pass. Exploring the Great Basin, Frémont verified that all the land was endorheic, without any outlet rivers flowing towards the sea. After exploring Utah Lake, Frémont traveled by way of the Pueblo until he reached Bent's Fort on the Arkansas River. In August 1844, Frémont and his party finally arrived back in St. Louis, enthusiastically received by the people, ending the journey that lasted over one year.

== Annexation of Texas and abortive 1844 candidacy ==
=== Background ===
At the encouragement of Spanish authorities, many Americans had settled in Texas in the 1820s, and the region became part of Mexico following the Mexican War of Independence. The United States frequently attempted to buy Texas, but Mexico consistently rejected these offers. By 1836, Anglo-Americans outnumbered Hispanics in Texas by a two-to-one margin, and the American settlers continued to hold slaves despite a Mexican law barring slavery. After taking office as president of Mexico in 1833, Antonio López de Santa Anna centralized policies and triggered revolts, including the Texas Revolution. Under the command of Sam Houston, the forces of the Republic of Texas decisively defeated Santa Anna's army at the Battle of San Jacinto. Following the battle, Santa Anna agreed to sign the Treaties of Velasco, which Texas leaders saw as an acknowledgment of Texan independence. The Mexican Congress refused to ratify the treaty, which had been obtained from Santa Anna under duress, and Mexico continued to regard Texas as a breakaway province. Mexico launched expeditions to retake control of Texas in subsequent years, but these expeditions proved unsuccessful. The people of Texas actively pursued joining the United States, but Jackson and Van Buren had been reluctant to inflame tensions over slavery by annexing another slave-holding state. Texas leaders simultaneously courted the British in the hopes that they would provide economic, military, and diplomatic aid against Mexico. Upon taking office, Tyler was strongly in favor of accomplishing annexation, but Secretary Webster's opposition convinced Tyler to focus on Pacific initiatives until later in his term.

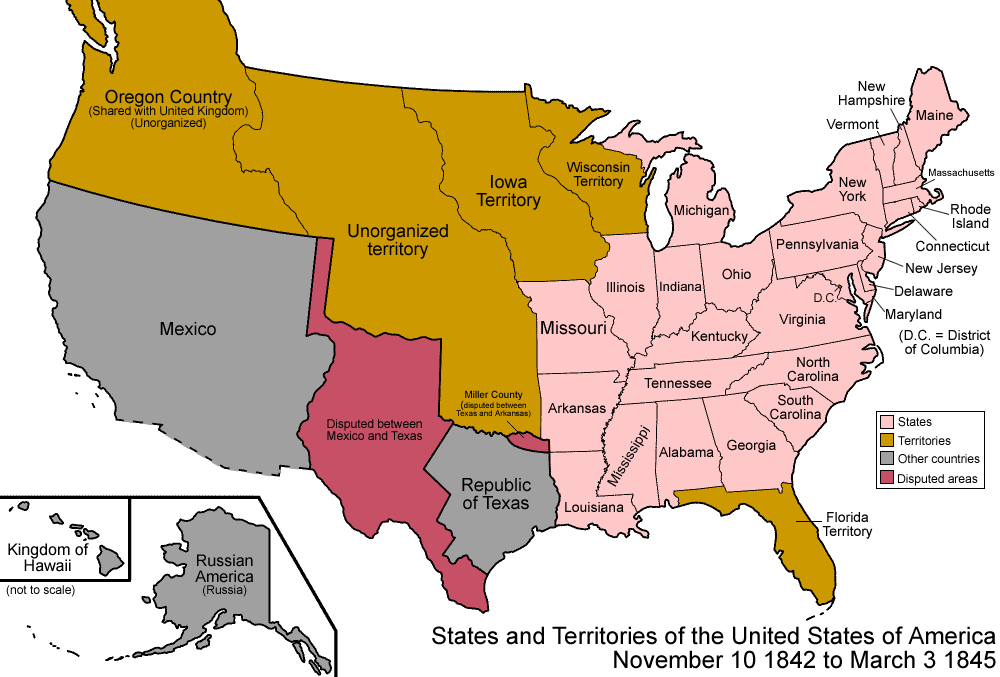
The boundaries of the United States and neighboring nations as they appeared in 1843. The Webster–Ashburton Treaty had formalized the border of Maine in the northeast, while the Republic of Texas in the southwest had a disputed border with Mexico. Tyler shared the Texans' desire for annexation, but it took several years of political wrangling to achieve.

Although Tyler's desire for western expansionism is agreed upon by historians and scholars, views differ regarding the motivations behind it. Biographer Edward C. Crapol notes that during the presidency of James Monroe, Tyler (then in the House of Representatives) had suggested slavery was a "dark cloud" hovering over the Union, and that it would be "well to disperse this cloud" so that with fewer blacks in the older slave states, a process of gradual emancipation would begin in Virginia and other upper Southern states. Historian William W. Freehling, however, wrote that Tyler's main motivation in annexing Texas was to outmaneuver suspected efforts by Great Britain to promote an emancipation of slaves in Texas that would weaken the institution in the United States. Norma Lois Peterson writes that Tyler believed annexation would be the defining accomplishment of his administration and boost his prospects for re-election.

=== Negotiations under Upshur ===
In early 1843, having completed the Webster–Ashburton treaty and other diplomatic efforts, Tyler felt ready to wholeheartedly pursue Texas. As a trial balloon, he dispatched his ally Thomas Walker Gilmer, then a congressman from Virginia, to publish a letter defending annexation, which was well received. Despite his successful relationship with Webster, Tyler knew he would need a Secretary of State who supported the Texas initiative. With Webster's work on the British treaty now completed, Tyler replaced Webster with Hugh S. Legaré of South Carolina.

With the help of newly appointed Treasury Secretary John C. Spencer, Tyler cleared out an array of officeholders, replacing them with pro-annexation partisans, in a reversal of his former stand against patronage. He elicited the help of political organizer Michael Walsh to build a political machine in New York. In exchange for an appointment as consul to Hawaii, journalist Alexander G. Abell wrote a flattering biography, Life of John Tyler, which was printed in large quantities and given to postmasters to distribute. Seeking to rehabilitate his public image, Tyler embarked on a nationwide tour in the spring of 1843. The positive reception of the public at these events contrasted with his ostracism back in Washington. The tour centered on the dedication of the Bunker Hill Monument in Boston, Massachusetts. Shortly after the dedication, Tyler learned of Legaré's sudden death, which dampened the festivities and caused him to cancel the rest of the tour. Following the death of Legaré, Tyler appointed Secretary of the Navy Abel Upshur as his new Secretary of State. Upshur and his adviser, Duff Green, believed that Britain sought to convince Texas to abolish slavery in a complicated scheme designed to undermine the interests of the Southern United States. Though the government of British Prime Minister Robert Peel in fact had little interest in pushing abolitionism in Texas, the fear of such a scheme motivated Upshur to pursue annexation as quickly as possible in order to preserve slavery in Texas.

Tyler and Upshur began quiet negotiations with the Texas government, promising military protection from Mexico in exchange for a commitment to annexation. Secrecy was necessary, as the Constitution required congressional approval for such military commitments. Upshur planted rumors of possible British designs on Texas to drum up support among Northern voters, who were wary of admitting a new pro-slavery state. Texas leaders, meanwhile, were reluctant to sign any annexation treaty that might be rejected by the U.S. Senate. Despite the continued skepticism of Texan leaders, the negotiators finalized the terms of an annexation treaty before the end of February 1844. Under the terms of the treaty, Texas would join as a territory with statehood to follow later, and the United States would assume both the public lands and the public debt of Texas.

=== USS Princeton disaster ===
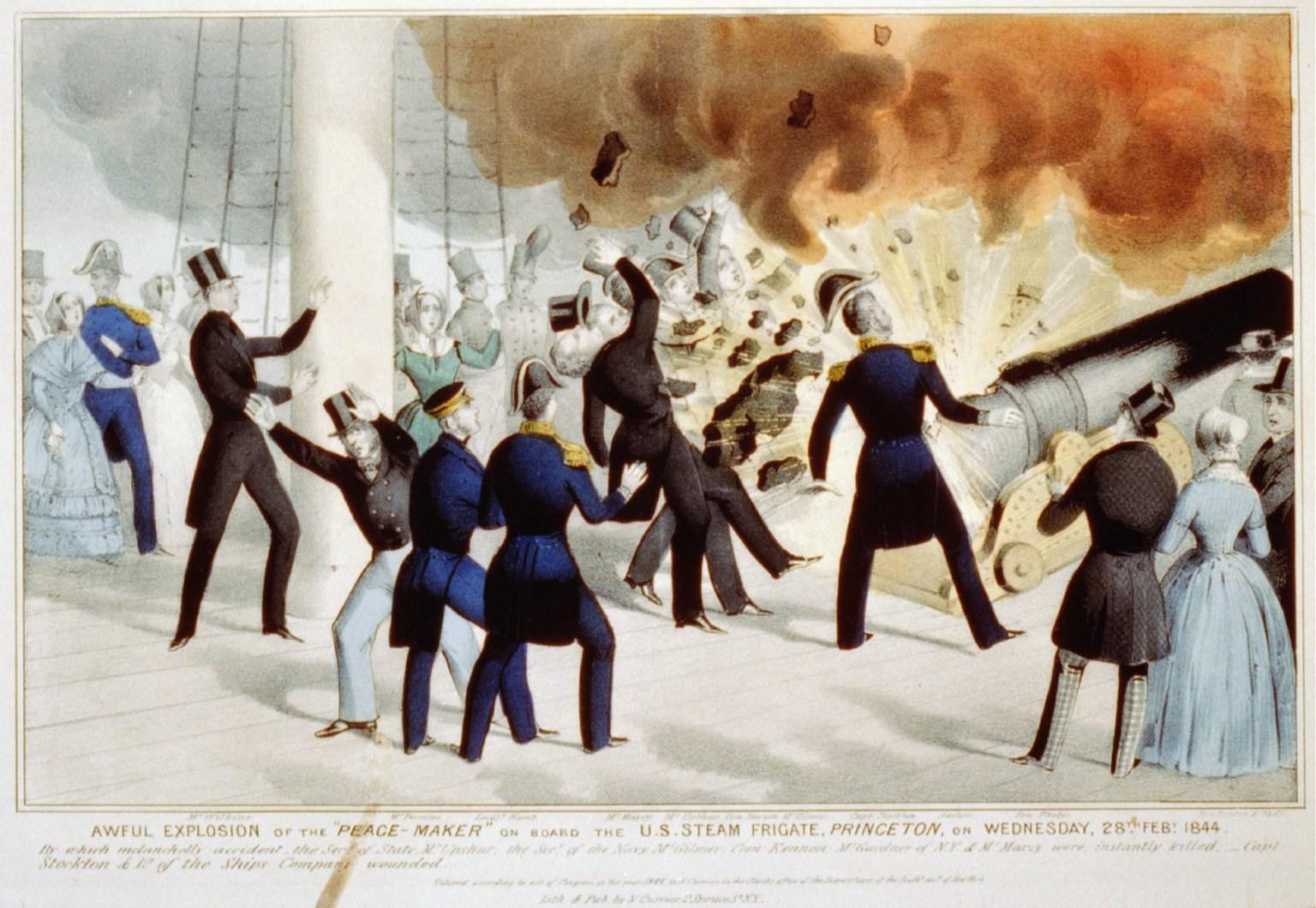
A lithograph of the Princeton disaster (1844).

A ceremonial cruise down the Potomac River was held aboard the newly built USS Princeton on February 28, 1844, the day after completion of the annexation treaty. Aboard the ship were 400 guests, including Tyler and his cabinet, as well as the world's largest naval gun, the "Peacemaker." The gun was ceremonially fired several times in the afternoon to the great delight of the onlookers. Several hours later, Captain Robert F. Stockton was convinced by the crowd to fire one more shot. A malfunction caused an explosion that killed Gilmer and Upshur, as well Virgil Maxcy, David Gardiner, Commodore Beverly Kennon, and Armistead, Tyler's black slave and body servant. Having remained safely below deck, Tyler was unhurt. The death of David Gardiner had a devastating effect on David's daughter, Julia Gardiner, who fainted and was carried to safety by the president himself. Julia later recovered from her grief and married President Tyler.

=== Appointment of Calhoun ===
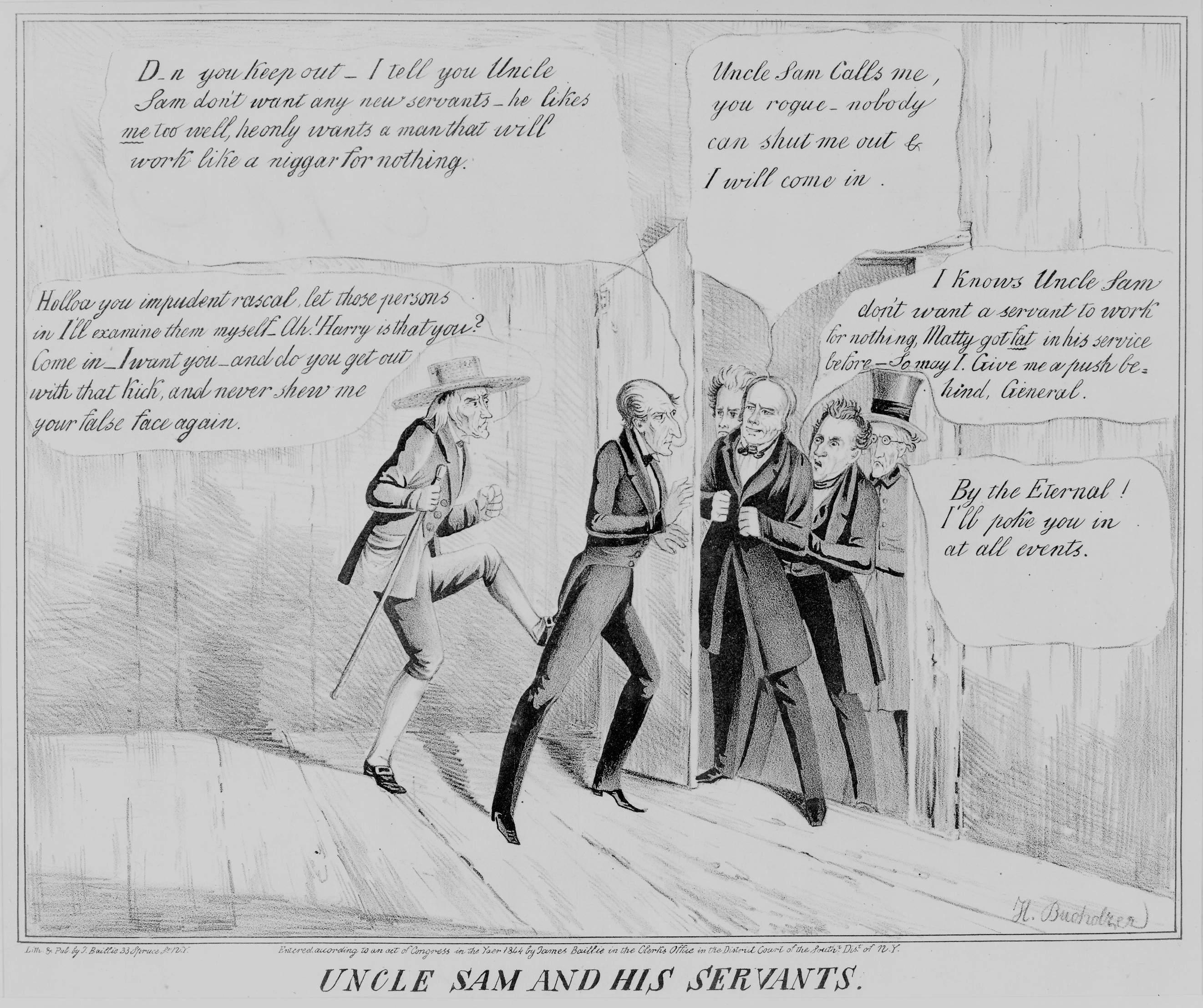
An anti-Tyler satire lampoons his efforts to secure a second term. Tyler pushes the door shut on opponents Clay, Polk, Calhoun, and Jackson, as Uncle Sam demands that he let Clay in.

In early March 1844, Tyler appointed Senator John C. Calhoun as his Secretary of State. Calhoun was the fourth Secretary of State in a year. Tyler's good friend, Virginia Representative Henry A. Wise, wrote that following the Princeton disaster, Wise went on his own to extend Calhoun the position through a colleague, who assumed that the offer came from the president. When Wise went to tell Tyler what he had done, the president was angry but felt that the action now had to stand. Though Tyler had long been hesitant to bring the ambitious Calhoun into his cabinet, some historians have cast doubt on Wise's interpretation of events. Regardless of Tyler's motivations for appointing Calhoun, the decision was a serious tactical error that ruined any hopes Tyler had had for establishing his own political respectability. Calhoun favored Texas annexation and had a strong following in the South. But in the eyes of Northerners, Calhoun was the symbol of Nullification and efforts to extend slavery, and his appointment undercut Tyler's attempts to disassociate the issue of Texas from the issue of slavery.

In April 1844, Calhoun and two Texas negotiators signed the treaty providing for the annexation of Texas. When the text of the annexation treaty was leaked to the public, it met opposition from the Whigs, who would oppose anything that might enhance Tyler's status, as well as from foes of slavery and those who feared a confrontation with Mexico, which had announced that it would view annexation as a hostile act by the United States. Both Clay and Van Buren, the respective frontrunners for the Whig and Democratic nominations, decided to come out against annexation. Knowing this, when Tyler sent the treaty to the Senate for ratification in April 1844, he did not expect it to pass.

=== 1844 candidacy ===
Following Tyler's break with the Whigs in 1841, he had begun to shift back to his old Democratic party, but its members, especially the followers of Van Buren, were not ready to receive him. Tyler knew that, with little chance of election, the only way to salvage his presidency and legacy was to move public opinion in favor of the Texas issue. He formed a third party, the Tyler Party, using the officeholders and political networks he had built over the previous year. A chain of pro-Tyler newspapers across the country put out editorials promoting his candidacy throughout the early months of 1844. Reports of meetings held throughout the country suggest that support for the president was not limited to officeholders. The Tyler supporters, holding signs reading "Tyler and Texas!", held their nominating convention in May 1844, just as the Democratic Party was holding its own presidential convention.

Midway through Tyler's presidency, the Democrats were badly divided, especially between followers of Calhoun and Van Buren. Former Vice President Richard Mentor Johnson of Kentucky, former Secretary of War Lewis Cass of Michigan, and Senator James Buchanan of Pennsylvania also loomed as contenders for the 1844 Democratic presidential nomination. By late 1843, Van Buren had emerged as the front-runner for the Democratic presidential nomination, and Calhoun decided that he would not seek the nomination. As proponents of the annexation of Texas came to oppose his candidacy, Van Buren's strength in the party diminished. At the 1844 Democratic National Convention, Van Buren failed to win the necessary super-majority of Democratic votes. It was not until the ninth ballot that the Democrats turned their sights to James K. Polk, a less prominent candidate who supported annexation. A protege of Andrew Jackson, Polk had hoped to win the vice presidential nomination prior to the convention, but Democratic delegates instead made Polk the first "dark horse" presidential nominee in U.S. history. Polk's nomination pleased the followers of Calhoun, and they threw their support behind his candidacy rather than Tyler's. Clay, meanwhile, had been nominated for president at the 1844 Whig National Convention.

=== Ongoing debates and the 1844 election ===
The full Senate began to debate the Senate annexation treaty in mid-May 1844, and it rejected the treaty by a vote of 16–35 on June 8. Most of the support for the treaty came from Democrats who represented slave states. Changing tactics, Tyler submitted the treaty to the House of Representatives. He hoped to convince Congress to annex Texas by joint resolution, which required a simple majority vote in both houses of Congress rather than a two-thirds vote in the Senate. The debate over Texas, as well as Oregon to a lesser degree, dominated American political discourse throughout mid-1844. Former President Andrew Jackson, a staunch supporter of annexation, persuaded Polk to welcome Tyler back into the Democratic Party and ordered Democratic editors to cease their attacks on him. Satisfied by these developments, Tyler dropped out of the race in August and endorsed Polk for the presidency. In the public letter announcing his withdrawal, Tyler stated his belief that Polk's administration "will be a continuance of my own, since he will be found the advocate of most of my measures."

1844 Electoral College vote results

Clay had been confident of his own election after the Democratic convention, but his doubts grew as the election neared. Democrats like Robert Walker recast the issue of Texas annexation, arguing that Texas and as Oregon were rightfully American but had been lost during the Monroe administration. Walker further argued that Texas would provide a market for Northern goods and would allow for the "diffusion" of slavery, which in turn would lead to gradual emancipation. In response, Clay argued that the annexation of Texas would bring war with Mexico and increase sectional tensions. Ultimately, Polk triumphed in an extremely close election, defeating Clay 170–105 in the Electoral College; the flip of just a few thousand voters in New York would have given the election to Clay. The candidate of the abolitionist Liberty Party, James G. Birney, won several thousand anti-annexation votes in New York, and his presence in the race may have cost Clay the election. Aside from New York, Clay lost several states that Harrison had won, including Georgia, Louisiana, Mississippi, Maine, and Pennsylvania. In the concurrent congressional elections, the Democrats won control of the Senate and retained control of the House.

=== Annexation achieved ===
After the election, Tyler announced in his annual message to Congress that "a controlling majority of the people and a large majority of the states have declared in favor of immediate annexation." Congress debated annexation between December 1844 and February 1845. Polk's arrival in Washington, and his support for immediate annexation, helped unite Democrats behind Tyler's proposal to annex Texas by joint resolution. In late February 1845, the House by a substantial margin and the Senate by a bare 27–25 majority approved a joint resolution offering terms of annexation to Texas. Every Democratic senator voted for the bill, as did three Southern Whig senators. On March 1, three days before the end of his term, Tyler signed the annexation bill into law. The bill allowed the president to either re-open annexation negotiations or to extend an offer of statehood. It differed from Tyler's proposed treaty in that the United States would not take on the public lands or the public debt of Texas.

On March 3, the final full day of his presidency, Tyler extended an offer of annexation and statehood to Texas through his envoy, Andrew Jackson Donelson. Upon taking office, Polk considered withdrawing the offer, but he ultimately decided to uphold Tyler's decision. After some debate, Texas accepted the terms and entered the union on December 29, 1845, as the 28th state.

== Personal life ==
Amidst the troubles in his administration, Tyler had to deal with personal tragedies as well. His wife, Letitia, had been ill for some time, and did not participate in White House functions. She suffered a stroke and died on September 10, 1842.

After just five months, Tyler began courting the most sought-after socialite in Washington, D.C., Julia Gardiner, who at 22 years of age was 30 years younger than the president, and younger than three of his eight children. They were married in a small ceremony on June 26, 1844. This was the first time a president married while in office, and the wedding was widely covered by newspapers.

== Historical reputation ==
John Tyler

While academics and experts have both praised and criticized Tyler, the general public has little awareness of him at all. He is among the nation's most obscure presidents; in 2014, Time magazine reviewed the "Top 10 Forgettable Presidents":

After John Tyler earned the vice presidency on the strength of a campaign slogan that tacked him on as a postscript – "Tippecanoe and Tyler too" – his fate as a historical footnote seemed likely; and when he ascended to the presidency following the death of William Henry Harrison, being dubbed "His Accidency" made it a lock.

Nevertheless, Tyler's presidency has provoked highly divided responses. It is generally held in low esteem by historians; Edward P. Crapol began his biography John Tyler, the Accidental President (2006) by noting: "Other biographers and historians have argued that John Tyler was a hapless and inept chief executive whose presidency was seriously flawed." In The Republican Vision of John Tyler (2003), Dan Monroe observed that the Tyler presidency "is generally ranked as one of the least successful". Seager wrote that Tyler "was neither a great president nor a great intellectual," adding that despite a few achievements, "his administration has been and must be counted an unsuccessful one by any modern measure of accomplishment". A 2018 poll of the American Political Science Association's Presidents and Executive Politics section ranked Tyler as the 36th best president, while a 2017 C-SPAN poll of historians ranked Tyler as the 39th best president.

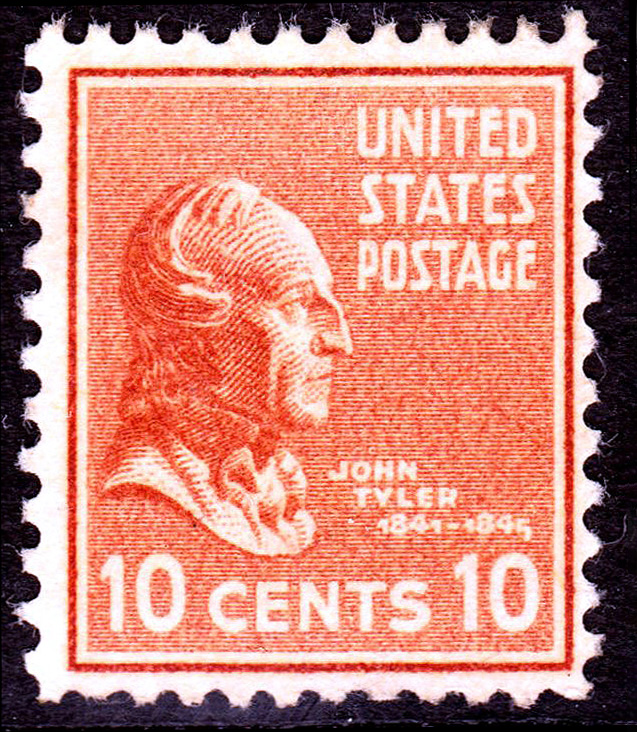
John Tyler appears on the ten-cent U.S. Postage stamp of the 1938 Presidential Series.

Others have expressed a more positive view of Tyler, especially regarding foreign policy. Monroe credits him with "achievements like the Webster–Ashburton treaty which heralded the prospect of improved relations with Great Britain, and the annexation of Texas, which added millions of acres to the national domain." Crapol argued that Tyler "was a stronger and more effective president than generally remembered", while Seager wrote, "I find him to be a courageous, principled man, a fair and honest fighter for his beliefs. He was a president without a party." Pointing to Tyler's advances in foreign policy and external factors such as Clay's determination to dominate Tyler's administration, Norma Lois Peterson deemed Tyler's presidency "flawed ... but ... not a failure". In Recarving Rushmore, libertarian author Ivan Eland ranked Tyler as the best president of all time. Louis Kleber, in his article in History Today, pointed out that Tyler brought integrity to the White House at a time when many in politics lacked it, and refused to compromise his principles to avoid the anger of his opponents.

By decisive action and adroit political maneuvering during his first weeks in office, Tyler forever made moot any future constitutional objections and established by usage the precedent for the vice president to become president on the death of an incumbent. His successful insistence that he was president, and not a caretaker or acting president, was a model for the succession of seven other presidents over the 19th and 20th centuries. Tyler's action of assuming both the title of the presidency and its full powers would be legally recognized in 1967, when it was codified in the Twenty-fifth Amendment. His use of veto power not only destroyed the Whig domestic program, but also established the precedent that the president could veto any bill passed by Congress. Jordan T. Cash concludes that:

The administration of John Tyler, therefore, shows us a strong isolated president exercising constitutional powers while still having some institutional restraints. It is an example of the executive alone in all its strengths and weaknesses, but primarily demonstrating the great inherent strength and power of the office in its constitutional, institutional, and political capacities.

== Works cited ==
- Cash, Jordan T. "The Isolated Presidency: John Tyler and Unilateral Presidential Power." American Political Thought 7.1 (2018): 26–56. online
- Chitwood, Oliver Perry (1964) [Orig. 1939, Appleton-Century]. John Tyler, Champion of the Old South. Russell & Russell. OCLC 424864.
- Crapol, Edward P. (2006). John Tyler, the Accidental President. University of North Carolina Press. ISBN 978-0-8078-3041-3.
- Crapol, Edward P. "John Tyler and the Pursuit of National Destiny." Journal of the Early Republic 17.3 (1997): 467–491. online
- Dinnerstein, Leonard (October 1962). "The Accession of John Tyler to the Presidency". The Virginia Magazine of History and Biography. 70 (4): 447–58. JSTOR 4246893.
- Freehling, William W. (1991). The Road to Disunion: Volume I: Secessionists at Bay. 1776–1854. Oxford University Press. ISBN 978-0-19-507259-4.
- Herring, George (2008). From Colony to Superpower: U.S. Foreign Relations Since 1776. New York: Oxford University Press. ISBN 978-0-19-507822-0.
- Howe, Daniel Walker (2007). What Hath God Wrought: the Transformation of America, 1815–1848. Oxford, NY: Oxford University Press. ISBN 978-0-19-507894-7.
- "John C. Fremont and Exploration of the American West". encyclopedia.com.
- Kleber, Louis C. (October 1975). "John Tyler". History Today. 25 (10): 697–703.
- Leahy, Christopher J. "Playing Her Greatest Role: Priscilla Cooper Tyler and the Politics of the White House Social Scene, 1841–44." Virginia Magazine of History and Biography 120.3 (2012): 237–269. excerpt
- May, Gary (2008). John Tyler. Times Books. ISBN 978-0-8050-8238-8.
- Monroe, Dan (2003). The Republican Vision of John Tyler. Texas A&M University Press. ISBN 1-58544-216-X.
- McCormick, Richard P. (2002). Henry F. Graff (ed.). The Presidents A Reference History William Henry Harrison and John Tyler (3 ed.). New York: Charles Scribner's Sons. pp. 139–151. ISBN 0-684-31226-3.
- McCormick, Richard P. (2002). Henry F. Graff (ed.). The Presidents A Reference History William Henry Harrison and John Tyler (3 ed.). New York: Charles Scribner's Sons. pp. 139–151. ISBN 0-684-31226-3.
- Nevins, Allan (1931). Allen Johnson; Dumas Malone (eds.). Dictionary of American Biography Frémont, John Charles. Vol. 7. New York: Charles Scribner's Sons. pp. 19–23.
- Peterson, Norma Lois (1989). The Presidencies of William Henry Harrison and John Tyler. University Press of Kansas. ISBN 978-0-7006-0400-5.
- Richards, Leonard L. (2007). The California Gold Rush and the Coming of the Civil War. New York: Vintage Books Random House Inc. ISBN 978-0-307-27757-2.
- Roseboom, Eugene H. (1970). A History of Presidential Elections. Macmillan Publishers. ISBN 978-0-02-604890-3.
- Seager, Robert II (1963). And Tyler Too: A Biography of John and Julia Gardiner Tyler. New York: McGraw-Hill. OCLC 424866.
- Spitzer, Robert J. (2016). "John Tyler". In Gormley, Ken (ed.). The Presidents and the Constitution: A Living History. New York: New York University Press. ISBN 978-1-4798-3990-2.
