= The Real Majority =

1970 book by Ben Wattenberg and Richard M. Scammon

The Real Majority: An Extraordinary Examination of the American Electorate
- First edition
- Author: Ben Wattenberg and Richard M. Scammon
- Language: English
- Subject: Political science
- Genre: Nonfiction
- Publisher: Coward-McCann
- Publication date: 1970
- Publication place: United States
- Media type: Print (Hardcover and Paperback)
- Pages: 347
- ISBN: 0-698-10308-4
- OCLC: 433654339

The Real Majority: An Extraordinary Examination of the American Electorate was a 1970 bestselling analysis of United States politics by Ben Wattenberg and Richard M. Scammon. The book analyzed electoral data, especially from the 1968 presidential election, to argue that the American electorate was centrist, and that parties or candidates, to be viable, must appeal to the "real majority" of the electorate at the center.

== Authors ==
The book was written by Ben J. Wattenberg and Richard M. Scammon, who were both moderate Democrats at that time. Wattenberg later became a prominent figure in the neo-conservative movement, although at the time of the book's publication he was a member of Social Democrats, USA.

== Summary ==
The authors argued that while the Democratic Party "owned" "the Economic Issue" (a broad category encompassing such issues as Social Security and employment), the Republicans likewise "owned" "the Social Issue" (crime, drugs, and morality). They argued that whichever party could exploit their own strengths, and neutralize their opponent's, would prevail.

The authors traced the dichotomy in part to voter concerns about "law and order" in the 1960s. The concern grew as disorder became associated with racial tension, activism and college radicalism; and the people associated with those issues generally had liberal attitudes on sexual behavior and drug use. The authors argued that the electorate at the time did not share this kind of liberalism.

The authors noticed many Democrats took a liberal stance on what they called issues of law and order and permissiveness, and said that this could be potentially disastrous. They intended the book to be a warning to Democrats about the danger. They argued that the "real majority" was still economically liberal, but socially conservative. They advised Democrats that Republicans would increasingly garner votes based on "the Social Issue".

The Real Majority is often compared and contrasted with The Emerging Republican Majority, a book by Republican strategist Kevin Phillips which was released at the same time. Phillips concluded that the majority was inevitable, a conclusion Wattenberg and Scammon reject.

== Reviews ==
Ruth Silva, a professor of political science at Pennsylvania State University, said the book was superior to Phillips' and called the book "must reading" for the far-left of the Democratic party, as well as Republicans and "every thoughtful citizen".

== Impact ==
This book is sometimes reported to have inspired the 1970 and 1972 political strategies of the Nixon administration. However, while many saw parallels between the book's thesis and Nixon's decision to use patriotism and anti-permissiveness to appeal to the so-called "silent majority", Nixon had already chosen this course of action before the book was published. Nevertheless, Nixon welcomed the book as a useful and interesting analysis of trends he had already observed, and encouraged Republicans to read it. Secondly, as the book was intended as a warning to Democrats, Nixon saw it as encouragement to deliver his own message all the more forcefully to ensure it succeeded despite political opponents who were now more aware of what he was doing.

== See also ==
- Nolan Chart
