= Think Tank with Ben Wattenberg =

- Starring: Ben Wattenberg

Production
- Executive producer: Andrew Walworth
- Running time: 30 minutes
- Production companies: New River Media and BJW Inc.

Original release
- Network: Syndication; Public Broadcasting Service
- Release: 1994 – 2010

Think Tank (1994-2010) — also known as Think Tank with Ben Wattenberg — was a discussion program that aired on Public Broadcasting Service (PBS), hosted by Ben Wattenberg. Andrew Walworth was co-creator and executive producer. The program was a co-production of New River Media and BJW Inc.

In addition to its weekly half-hour broadcast, Think Tank produced a number of special editions, including The First Measured Century, a three-hour documentary series and Heaven On Earth: The Rise and Fall of Socialism (2005), a three-hour documentary series on the history of socialism, based on the book of the same title by Joshua Muravchik. The series aired from 1994 to 2010.
