= Heaven on Earth: The Rise and Fall of Socialism =

Heaven on Earth: The Rise and Fall of Socialism (2005) is a three-hour PBS documentary film (sometimes recut as a three episodes documental mini-series) hosted by Ben Wattenberg and narrated by Henry Strozier. The series' Executive Producer is Andrew Walworth. The series was produced for PBS by New River Media, Inc. (re-incorporated as Grace Creek Media, Inc. in 2008) and first broadcast as a special edition of the television series Think Tank in June 2005.

Heaven on Earth begins with the pronouncement: "This 3-hour documentary explores one of the most powerful political ideas in history. Socialism spread farther and faster than any religion. Then, in almost the blink of an eye, it all collapsed. What happened?"

== Synopsis ==
The documentary is divided into three distinct hour-long sections:

=== Hour 1: The Rise ===
This section describes Robert Owen and early utopian socialism before discussing the development of the Communist Manifesto by Karl Marx and Friedrich Engels. Attention turns to Vladimir Lenin and the Bolshevik Revolution, the American labor movement, and finishes with an examination of Canadian socialism.

=== Hour 2: Revolutions ===
Section two focuses on revolutions in the 20th century, including the rise of Benito Mussolini and the spread of communism in China. Focus turns to democratic socialism in Great Britain, the Kibbutz movement in Israel, and socialism in Tanzania. The hour ends with discussion about the apparent failure of many of these movements.

=== Hour 3: The Collapse ===
Section three focuses on showing setbacks in established socialist/communist states, specifically in showing how capitalism has gained favor as the economic philosophy of formerly socialist states. The documentary ends with a return to the Kibbutz and discussion about how market forces have transformed the community.

== Companion book ==
Its companion book is Joshua Muravchik's 2003 book of the same name, which covers around the same material and follows pretty much the same structure (although it has a first chapter on Babeuf's Conspiracy of Equals, it adds George Meany to the Samuel Gompers chapter, the Kibbutz data are all in one conclusion, the Tanganyika/Tanzania chapter on Third World Socialism is not divided in two, just like the chapter on Mikhail Gorbachev is not, and the decay of the Labour Party and rise of Margaret Thatcher in the 1970s are just referred to in the beginning of the Tony Blair chapter).

An updated edition, titled Heaven on Earth: The Rise, Fall, and Afterlife of Socialism, was published on 2 April 2019, which adds a chapter discussing modern developments (about 1989 to 2018).

In this new edition, I have not emended any of the chapters of the original book, which cover the history of the previous centuries, other than to correct a few small (though embarrassing) errors and to update my account of the evolution of Israel’s kibbutzim. But I have added a long Epilogue, telling the story of this afterlife as it has unfolded thus far in the first decades of the new century.

— Joshua Muravchik, Preface of Heaven on Earth: The Rise, Fall, and Afterlife of Socialism

== Criticism ==
The book has been accused of factual errors and right-wing bias. Some criticism of conservative bias comes because many of the people involved with production of the documentary are self-proclaimed neoconservatives. Host Ben Wattenberg and author of the companion book Joshua Muravchik were scholars at the American Enterprise Institute, a conservative think tank. Michael Gove, who appears in the documentary film as a participant at the "Capitalist Ball", says, "I don't believe that socialism is dead because I don't believe that the impulse which drives people towards the Left, the desire to control, meddle and interfere in other people's lives, can ever die." Noa Shamir-Ronen, daughter of one of the founders of Israel's Kibbutz Ginosar, opines, "If in the past we used to work because of values, now there are new values. The supreme value – we are ordinary human beings – is money."
