= Richard M. Scammon =

American political scientist

Richard Scammon
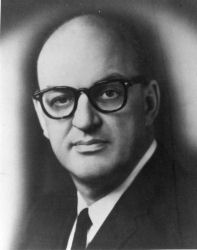

11th Director of the United States Census Bureau
- In office 1961–1965
- President: John F. Kennedy; Lyndon B. Johnson
- Preceded by: Robert Wilbur Burgess
- Succeeded by: A. Ross Eckler

Personal details
- Born: July 15, 1915; Minneapolis, Minnesota
- Died: April 27, 2001 (aged 85); Gaithersburg, Maryland
- Education: University of Minnesota; University of Michigan

Richard Montgomery Scammon (July 17, 1915 – April 27, 2001) was an American author, political scientist and elections scholar. He served as Director of the U.S. Bureau of the Census from 1961 to 1965. Afterwards, he worked for decades directing election analysis for NBC News.

== Life and career ==
Scammon was born in Minneapolis, Minnesota, and earned a bachelor's degree in political science from the University of Minnesota in 1935. He later earned a master's degree from the University of Michigan, also in political science.

Scammon enlisted in the Army during World War II, attaining the rank of captain. He served in occupied Germany after the war, rising to head the military government's office of elections and political parties. After his discharge, he served as chief of the research division in Western Europe for the U.S. Department of State from 1948 to 1955.

After leaving government service, Scammon founded the Elections Research Center in 1955. Its enduring contribution was the long-running series of volumes, America Votes, which for the first time provided standard and reliable statistics for the results of major elections in all 50 states. (The biennial compilations, published by Congressional Quarterly's imprint, CQ Books, were later co-produced with Scammon associate Alice McGillivray. After Scammon closed the Center in 1995, Rhodes Cook has continued to oversee production of America Votes. Scammon also served as a consultant to NBC News in the 1960 general election, working with the RCA computers and methods to call state-by-state totals for the Presidential race. He was briefly introduced to the audience on the air on election night.

In 1961, President John F. Kennedy appointed Scammon as Census Director, which he continued until 1965, during the administration of Lyndon B. Johnson. Indeed, on November 13, 1963, Scammon was at the table for the 1st Planning Meeting of JFK's 1964 Campaign To Re-elect The President; a campaign which never occurred. According to the Washington Post, while serving as Director of the Census, Scammon was "a personal adviser to Presidents Kennedy and Johnson on public opinion and political trends."

Returning to his voting research, Scammon was hired by NBC News to direct its extensive election-night coverage in November 1968. He continued his work as a consultant for NBC until 1988. In 1976 he was elected as a Fellow of the American Statistical Association.

As an author, Scammon's most famous work was The Real Majority: An Extraordinary Examination of the American Electorate (1970), co-authored with Ben J. Wattenberg. The New York Times described it as "arguing that, for the Democratic Party to survive, it needed to look beyond the economic issues that dominated the American electoral scene in the first half of the 20th century, [and] toward social issues that deeply disturbed voters in middle America." In Scammon's words, the typical voter was "unyoung, unpoor and unblack." His blunt phrasing "shocked many Democrats, but resonated true with others."

In some ways, The Real Majority served as an answer to Kevin Phillips's 1969 volume, The Emerging Republican Majority. And it presaged a shift away from the politics of the New Deal, and towards a more ideological politics, especially at the presidential level, that largely benefited Republicans in 1972, 1980, 1984 and 1988.

Scammon was married to Mary Allen Scammon and lived in Chevy Chase, Maryland for five decades. He died of Alzheimer's disease at a rest home in Gaithersburg.
