= The First Measured Century =

2000 documentary film

The First Measured Century: The Other Way of Looking at American History is a three-hour PBS documentary film hosted by Ben J. Wattenberg. The film was produced for PBS by BJW, Inc. and New River Media, Inc. and was first broadcast in December 2000. The film traces American history during the 20th century through a sequence of vignettes of pioneering social scientists who used numerical tools to examine America. The film mixes archival footage, archival still photography and artwork, interviews with contemporary experts, graphical animations of statistical trends, and on-camera narrative appearances by the host. Information from Middletown IV, a 1999 replication of Middletown studies of Muncie, Indiana, first begun by Robert and Helen Lynd in 1924, is included in the film and companion volume.

== Synopsis ==
- Segment One – Frederick Jackson Turner's Frontier Thesis
- Segment Two – The New Immigrants, Head Shapes, and the Melting Pot: Franz Boas versus Scientific Racism
- Segment Three – Infant and Maternal Mortality: How Julia Lathrop and the Children's Bureau Tried to Save the Babies
- Segment Four – Middletown: A Study in Modern American Culture. Robert and Helen Lynd Measure Muncie, Indiana
- Segment Five – Recent Social Trends: 1900 to 1930. Herbert Hoover Measures the Nation
- Segment Six – Measurements and Myths of the Great Depression
- Segment Seven – George Gallup and the Scientific Opinion Poll
- Segment Eight – World War II: the Homefront
- Segment Nine – How the Suburbs Changed America
- Segment Ten – Social Science in America's Bedroom: Alfred Kinsey Measures Sexual Behavior
- Segment Eleven – Betty Friedan and The Feminine Mystique
- Segment Twelve – "The Moynihan Report": When Politics and Sociology Collide
- Segment Thirteen – Crime, Broken Windows, and James Q. Wilson.
- Segment Fourteen – The Changing Economy: Inflation, Stagflation, and Deregulation
- Segment Fifteen – Checking in on Middletown. Ted Caplow and "The First Measured Century" Return to Muncie
- Segment Sixteen – Census 2000: The New Immigration, and the Changing Face of America

== Interviews ==
The First Measured Century includes on-camera interviews with forty experts: Howard M. Bahr, Lee D. Baker, Alan Brinkley, Theodore Caplow, William Chafe, John Milton Cooper Jr., William Cronon, Elliot Currie, Christopher DeMuth, Betty Friedan, Milton Friedman, Francis Fukuyama, Alec Gallup, George Gallup Jr., Paul Gebhard, Bruce Geelhoed, James Gregory, Kenneth T. Jackson, Matthew Frye Jacobson, Christopher Jencks, James H. Jones, Alfred E. Kahn, David M. Kennedy, Alice Kessler-Harris, Nancy Koehn, Alan Kraut, Seymour Martin Lipset, Glenn Loury, Staughton Lynd, David Moore, Daniel Patrick Moynihan, Robyn Muncy, William O'Neill, Ken Prewitt, Rita J. Simon, Daphne Spain, Paul Volcker, James Q. Wilson, William Julius Wilson, and Daniel Yankelovich. Some scholars have cited the interviews themselves in other writings.

== Companion volume ==
The documentary film is accompanied by a reference book of the same title but different subtitle: The First Measured Century: An Illustrated Guide to Trends in America, 1900–2000. Theodore Caplow, Louis Hicks, and Ben J. Wattenberg are the authors. The AEI Press (in-house publisher for the American Enterprise Institute) published the book. Unusually for a companion book to a documentary film, the book does not follow the synopsis of the film and does not include much of the narrative material. Instead, fifteen chapters provide a dense array of time series data and interpretive essays about American society in the 20th century. The companion volume has become a standard source of reference material about America in the 20th century.

== Critical reception ==
The First Measured Century received a Gold Award for Documentary Production at WorldFest Houston and the bronze medal at the 2001 Telly Awards. The First Measured Century received favorable notice in The New York Times, and Teaching Sociology.

The companion volume was reviewed separately in Population and Development Review, The American Statistician, The New York Times, the Washington Post, and Commentary Magazine.
Excerpts from The First Measured Century were used in another documentary film, also produced by New River Media, The Idea Makers: The Women of Hull House (Princeton, NJ: Films for the Humanities and Sciences, 2004).

The authors of the companion volume gave a one-hour presentation about the project to an audience at Olsson's Books and Records in Washington, DC, on May 22, 2001. This is available online from C-SPAN.

== Middletown IV ==
The replication of surveys in Muncie, Indiana (Middletown studies) over a 75-year period from 1924 to 1999 is an unusually long timeframe for measuring social trends in America. Information from the 1999 iteration of the surveys was used to trace trends in the attitudes of adolescents.
