= Fern Schumer Chapman =

American journalist and author

Fern Schumer Chapman (born November 29, 1954) is a journalist and author best known for her autobiographical book Motherland: Beyond the Holocaust - A Mother-Daughter Journey to Reclaim the Past. Her second book, Is It Night or Day?, was released in 2010. She is also the author of a blog, Half-life: A blog about immigration, loss and legacy.

== Biography ==
Fern Schumer Chapman is a former reporter for the Chicago Tribune and Forbes magazine. Her work also has appeared in The Washington Post, U.S. News & World Report, Fortune, and The Wall Street Journal. A graduate of the University of Wisconsin–Madison with a master's degree from Northwestern University's Medill School of Journalism, Chapman has taught writing seminars at Northwestern University. She is the mother of three children. In addition to this, Fern Schumer Chapman also focuses on sibling estrangement.

== Motherland: Beyond the Holocaust - A Mother-Daughter Journey to Reclaim the Past ==
The book is a non-fiction account that follows a young mother's pilgrimage into her family's history. Author Chapman uneasily accompanies her mother, Edith, a Holocaust escapee, on a baffling visit to the German village her mother left at the age of 12. Edith, the youngest member of the town's only Jewish family, was sent alone and terrified to America to escape the Nazis in 1938. Nearly half a century later, mother and daughter return to the village and gradually realize that no one has escaped the shame, guilt and lingering scars of the war. The book is used in middle school, high school and college classrooms, offering young people an opportunity to explore issues of fairness, identity and social justice.

== Is It Night or Day? ==
Published by Farrar, Straus & Giroux, Chapman's second book was released in 2010. Is It Night or Day? captures Edith's immigration experience to America. Edith (the author's mother) was part of a small, little-known American rescue operation that saved about 1,000 children from the Nazis. Edith came to this country without her parents when she was only 12 years old.

== Award and honors ==
Accolades for Is It Night or Day?

- Junior Library Guild selection, 2010
- Booklist's Top Ten Historical Fiction for Youth list, 2010
- YALSA Best Fiction, 2010 nominee
- Chicago Public Library's Best of the Best, 2010
- Sydney Taylor Notable Book for older readers, 2011

Accolades for Motherland

- Illinois Author of the Year, 2004 (Illinois Association of Teachers of English Award)
- Selection for Read for a Lifetime, 2008 Booklist
- Selection for one book/one community for “Quad Cities Reads” and “Racine Reads”
- Film rights optioned
- Finalist for the National Jewish Book Awards
- Featured on “The Oprah Winfrey Show” (watch interview here)
- Named a “Discover New Great Writers” title by Barnes & Noble
- German and Dutch editions available
