= Ruth C. Silva =

American political scientist

Ruth Caridad Silva
- Born: 1920 or 1921
- Died: April 1, 1995; State College, Pennsylvania
- Education: University of Michigan
- Scientific career
- Fields: Political science
- Workplaces: Wheaton College; Pennsylvania State University; Cairo University

Ruth Caridad Silva (1920 or 1921—April 1, 1995) was an American political scientist. She was a scholar of presidential succession and apportionment in the United States. She spent much of her career at Pennsylvania State University.

== Life and career ==
Silva attended the University of Michigan, where she received her Bachelor of Arts degree and Master of Arts degree in 1943, and completed her PhD in 1948. After her PhD, she became an instructor at Wheaton College. In 1948, she became a professor at Pennsylvania State University, where she worked for the remainder of her career. In 1952–1953 she worked as Fulbright Professor at Cairo University (then King Fuad I University).

In 1951, Silva published Presidential Succession. The book devoted five chapters to the intricacies of presidential succession laws in the United States, and ended with a study of presidential succession-related policies. She conducted research for many years on the procedures for replacing presidents who were no longer able to perform their responsibilities.

In 1962, Silva published the book Rum, Religion, and Votes: 1928 Re-examined. The book studied the 1928 United States presidential election, focusing in particular on the question of why Al Smith suffered such a lopsided defeat, and examining the extent to which it was due to prejudice against his Catholicism. The book was particularly noted for its use of multivariable regressions to analyze elections, which was then a new application of a methodology that had been made possible by recent advancements in computing.

Other work by Silva concerned political systems in the United States, including voting procedures and institutions like presidential primaries. In 1960, Silva prepared the report Legislative Apportionment for the New York State Temporary Commission on Revision and Simplification of the Constitution.

== Selected works ==
- Presidential Succession (1951)
- Rum, Religion, and Votes: 1928 Re-examined (1962)
- American Government Democracy and Liberty in Balance, with Edward Keynes, Hugh A. Bone, and David W. Adamany (1976)
