= Tyler Party =

American political party (1844)

- Other name: National Democratic, Tyler Democratic
- Leader: John Tyler
- Founded: May 27, 1844
- Dissolved: August 20, 1844
- Split from: Whig Party; Democratic Party
- Merged into: Democratic Party
- Newspaper: The Madisonian
- Ideology: Texas annexation

The Tyler Party, or Tyler Democratic Party, was an American political party formed by supporters of President John Tyler in 1844 to launch a presidential campaign against the Whig and Democratic parties. The party merged into the Democratic Party during the 1844 presidential election, following the surprise nomination of James K. Polk.

== Founding ==
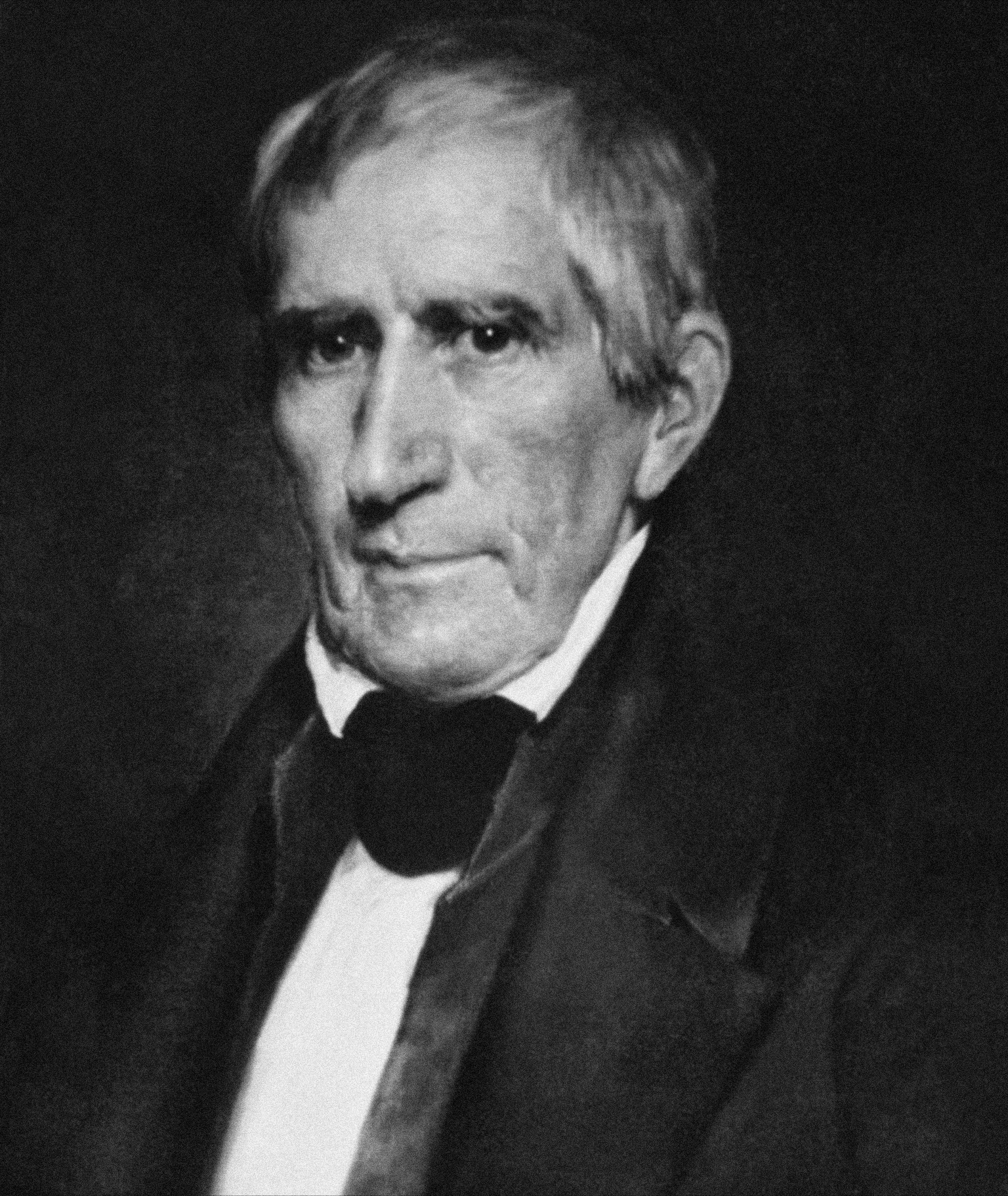
William Henry Harrison

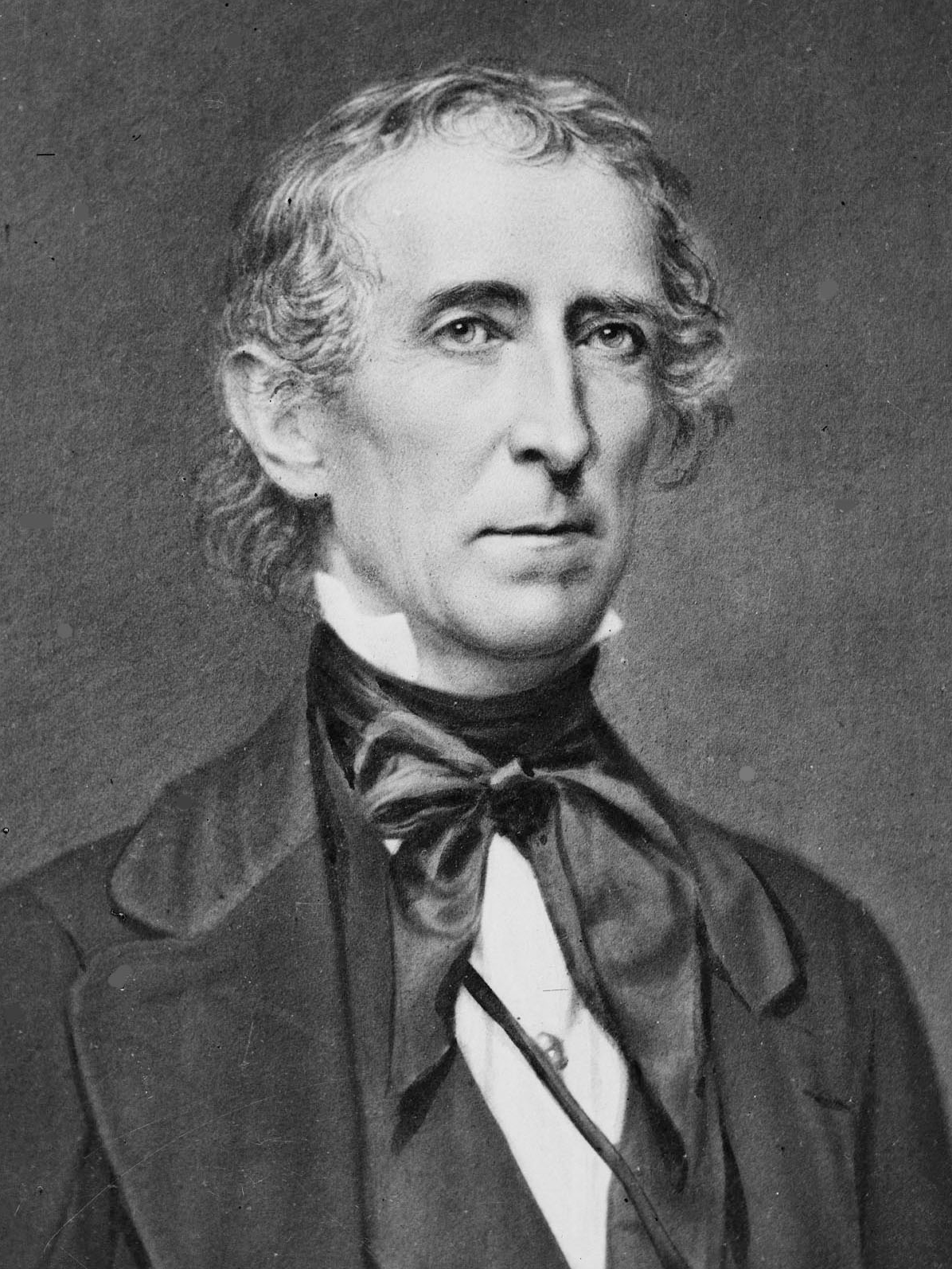
John Tyler

Upon the death of President William Henry Harrison thirty days into his term, Vice President John Tyler took office, and would serve for the remaining 47 months of Harrison's four year term. Despite the fact that Harrison and Tyler were both members of the Whig Party, Tyler found much of the Whig platform unconstitutional, and he vetoed several bills favored by party leader Henry Clay. In 1841 Tyler was forced out of the Whig Party after continued contention with Whig leaders. One year later, the Whig Party was routed in the 1842 House elections, where the party lost sixty-nine seats. By 1844, the Whigs would lose control of the Senate.

After being expelled from the Whig Party, Tyler attempted to return to the Democratic Party, but the still pro-Van Buren party would not allow him to enter. This led to Tyler's realization that the only way he could maintain his legacy was to show public support for a proposed annexation of Texas.

On the same day as the Democratic Convention, thousands of Tyler supporters marched to Baltimore, Maryland, and held their own convention. They believed that the Democrats, deadlocked between Martin Van Buren and Lewis Cass, would choose Tyler as a compromise candidate to unite the party. Democratic editor James Gordon Bennett Sr. of the New York Herald, then among the most popular newspapers in the country, would tacitly lend his support to Tyler's nomination. Tyler would additionally endorse a smaller newspaper, The Madisonian, as his campaign's official organ. However, the Democrats instead chose James K. Polk, a former Speaker of the House, as their candidate, much to the dismay of the Tylerites.

== Party platform ==
Despite the fact that Tyler was determined to win another term, his new party lacked a national party platform, although previously-held state Tyler conventions had written platforms. Several state Tyler conventions nominated former vice president Richard Mentor Johnson for the vice presidency, and Johnson consented to being Tyler's running mate. The issue that held precedence for Tyler was the annexation of Texas, which was made limp by Polk's announcement of his support in favor of annexation.

== Merger ==
By late July and early August, Tyler and the Democrats had entered negotiations. The Democrats aimed to prevent Tyler from spoiling the election and giving the victory to Henry Clay, while Tyler hoped for the Democrats to commit themselves to the annexation of Texas. Andrew Jackson sent word to Tyler saying that if the president withdrew from the race, that he would at least have the pleasure of taking Clay down with him. With assurances that his followers would be welcomed into the Democratic ranks, Tyler announced the end of his candidacy on August 20 and threw his meager support to Polk. Polk would narrowly defeat Clay in the election and would follow through on Tyler's late order to annex Texas, eventually culminating in the Mexican–American War.

== See also ==
- List of political parties in the United States
