= Family of Martin Van Buren =

Martin Van Buren, the eighth president of the United States, was a son of Abraham Van Buren (1737–1817) and Maria Hoes (or Goes) Van Alen (1747–1818).

== Parents ==
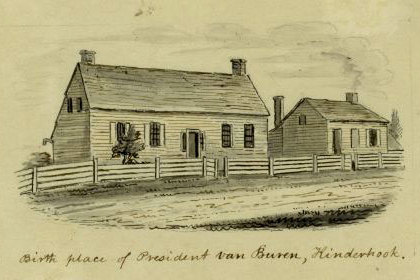
Martin Van Buren's birthplace. Later torn down after it fell into disrepair, in 1782, it was located about a quarter mile east of Kinderhook's village center.

Van Buren was born in Kinderhook, New York on December 5, 1782. His father Abraham Van Buren (1737–1817) owned and operated an inn and tavern. He was a Patriot during the American Revolution, and served as a captain in the Albany County Militia's 7th Regiment. He later joined the Jeffersonian Republicans, became active in local politics and government, and served as Kinderhook's town clerk from 1787 to 1797.

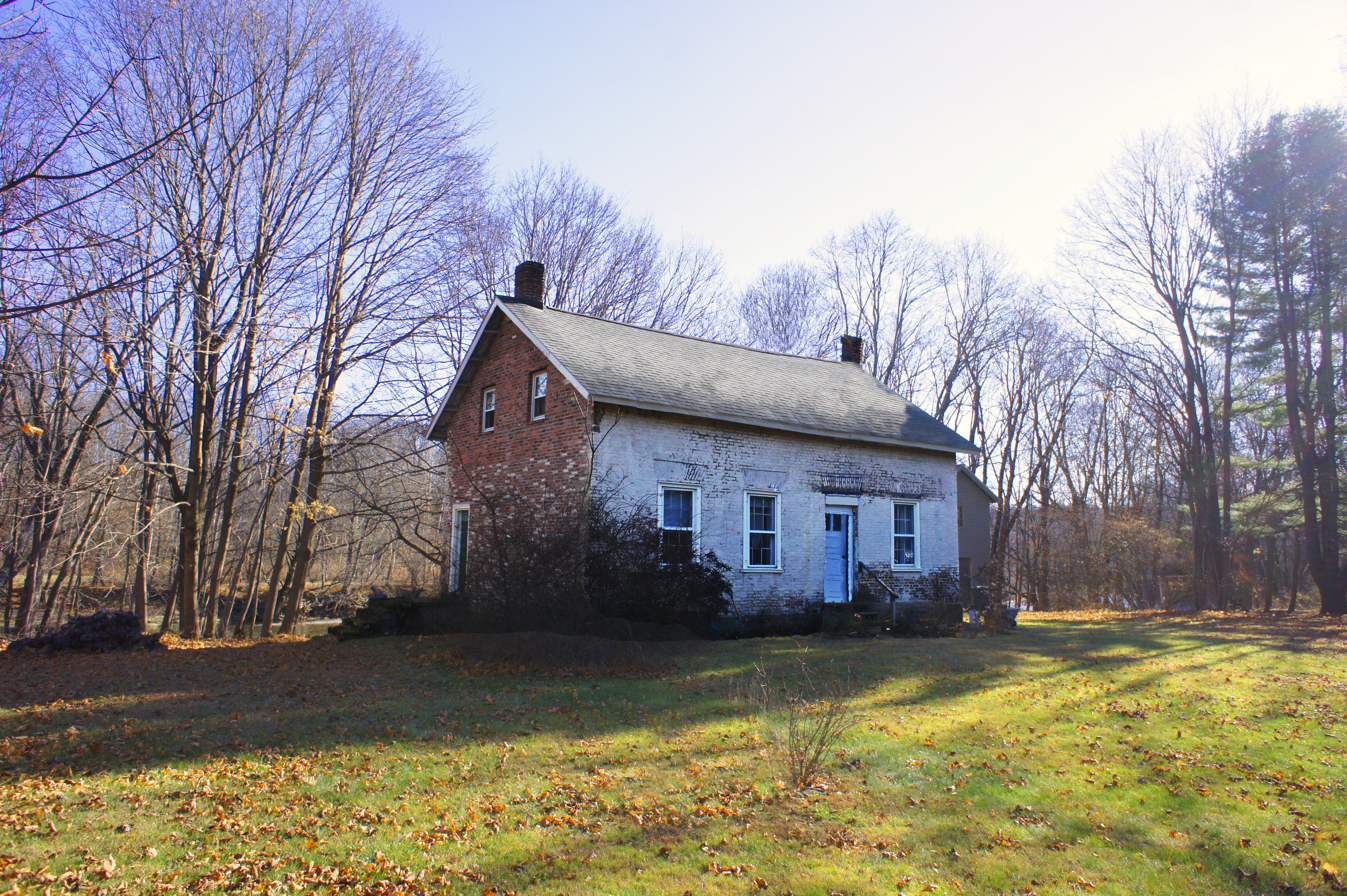
"Hoes House:, the ancestral Home of Martin Van Buren's mother Maria Hoes Van Alen.

In 1776, Abraham Van Buren married Maria Hoes (or Goes) Van Alen (1747–1818), the widow of Johannes Van Alen.

Although both Abraham and Maria Van Buren were fifth generation residents of the Province of New York, all of their forebears were of Dutch ancestry, as was the case for most of Kinderhook's residents, and they still spoke Dutch as their first language. The future U.S. president was baptized on December 15, 1782, as "Maarten Van Buren", the original Dutch spelling of his name. He had four full siblings and three half-siblings.

== Siblings ==
From his mother's first marriage to Johannes Van Alen, Van Buren's half-siblings included:

- Marytje (or Maria) Van Alen (1768–1829), who married John L. Hoes.
- John I. Van Alen (1770–1805)
- James I. Van Alen (1772–1822), who practiced law with Van Buren for a time and also served as a member of Congress (1807–1809).

From his parents' marriage, his full siblings included:

- Dirckie "Derike" Van Buren (1777–1865), who married Barent Hoes (1777–1853). Barent Hoes was the brother of Martin Van Buren's wife, and served in local offices including town clerk.
- Jannetje (Called "Hannah" or "Jane") Van Buren (1780–1838), who never married and who resided with her sister Dirckie Van Buren and brother-in-law Barent Hoes.
- Lawrence (or Laurence) Van Buren (1786–1868), a store owner and attorney who served as a militia officer in the War of 1812 and held local offices including Kinderhook Town Supervisor, postmaster, and Democratic presidential elector in 1852.
- Abraham Abramse Van Buren (1788–1836), an attorney who served as Columbia County Surrogate after Martin Van Buren and James I. Van Alen.

== Hannah Hoes Van Buren ==
On February 21, 1807, Van Buren married Hannah Hoes, his childhood sweetheart and a daughter of his first cousin, in Catskill, New York. Hannah Hoes was the daughter of Johannes Dircksen Hoes (1753–1789), and Maria Quakenbush (1754–1852), who were of Dutch ancestry. Like Van Buren, she was raised in a Dutch home; she spoke primarily Dutch, and spoke English with a distinct accent. Van Buren was devoted to his shy, blue-eyed bride, whom he always called "Jannetje", a Dutch pet form of Johanna. After twelve years of marriage, Hannah Van Buren contracted tuberculosis and died on February 5, 1819, at the age of thirty-five. Van Buren never remarried.

During the first half of Van Buren's presidential term, the White House lacked an official hostess. Angelica Singleton, who married Van Buren's son Abraham in 1838, performed the role of hostess of the White House and First Lady of the United States for the remainder of his presidency.

== Children ==
The Van Burens had six children, four of whom lived to adulthood:

=== Abraham Van Buren II (1807–1873) ===
Abraham attended West Point and served in the Mexican-American War. He married Angelica Singleton in 1838. They had four children:

- Rebecca Van Buren (1840–1840)
- Singleton Van Buren (1841–1885)
- Martin Van Buren (1844–1885)
- Travis Coles Van Buren (1848–1889)

=== Stillborn daughter ===
Martin and Hannah Van Buren had a stillborn daughter in around 1809.

=== John Van Buren (1810–1866) ===
John attended Yale University and served as attorney general of New York. He married Elizabeth Vanderpoel in June 1841, and they had one child, Sarah Anna Vanderpoel Van Buren (1842–1923).

=== Martin Van Buren Jr. (1812–1855) ===
Born December 20, 1812, Martin served as a political aide to his father. Martin and his father visited Europe in the mid-1850s, partly to benefit his poor health. He died in Paris, France, on March 19, 1855, having never married or had children.

=== Winfield Scott Van Buren (1814–1814) ===
Winfield, named for U.S. general Winfield Scott, was born in 1814 and died shortly thereafter.

=== Smith Thompson Van Buren (1817–1876) ===
Born in 1817, Smith Thompson Van Buren was named for Smith Thompson, Martin Van Buren's close friend and mentor. Smith Van Buren's mother Hannah Hoes Van Buren died when he was two years old; with his father away frequently absent due to his political career, Smith was raised by relatives.

On June 18, 1842, Smith Van Buren married Ellen King James (1823–1849), the aunt of writer Alice James, writer Henry James, and psychologist William James. Their marriage produced four children:

- Ellen James Van Buren (1844–1929), who married Stuyvesant Fish Morris in 1868.
- Edward L. Van Buren (1848–1873)
- Catharine Barber Van Buren (1849–1908), who married Peyton F. Miller.
- Hannah Van Buren (1846–1846)

In 1855, Van Buren married Henrietta Eckford Irving (1832–1921), a great-niece of Washington Irving. Their marriage produced three children:

- Martin Van Buren (1856–1942)
- Eliza Eckford Van Buren (1857–1942)
- Marion Irving Van Buren (1861–1928), who married Hamilton Emmons.

Martin Van Buren wanted to make Smith his sole heir on the condition that he and his family move to Lindenwald, his home in Kinderhoook, New York. Smith agreed to do so, with the condition that he could alter the appearance of his father's house. These changes, completed between 1849 and 1850, transformed Lindenwald from Federalist style to Italianate-Gothic Victorian style.

Smith Van Buren died at the Hudson River State Hospital in Poughkeepsie, New York, on December 10, 1875.

Smith Van Buren served as his father's literary executor. Following Smith's death, his second wife Henrietta and his son-in-law Stuyvesant Fish Morris donated the bulk of the Library of Congress' collection of Martin Van Buren's papers, including the manuscript copy of his autobiography.

== Famous descendants ==
American editor, literary critic, and playwright Wolcott Gibbs was a great-great-grandson of Martin Van Buren through his son John.
