= Bibliography of Martin Van Buren =

Martin Van Buren
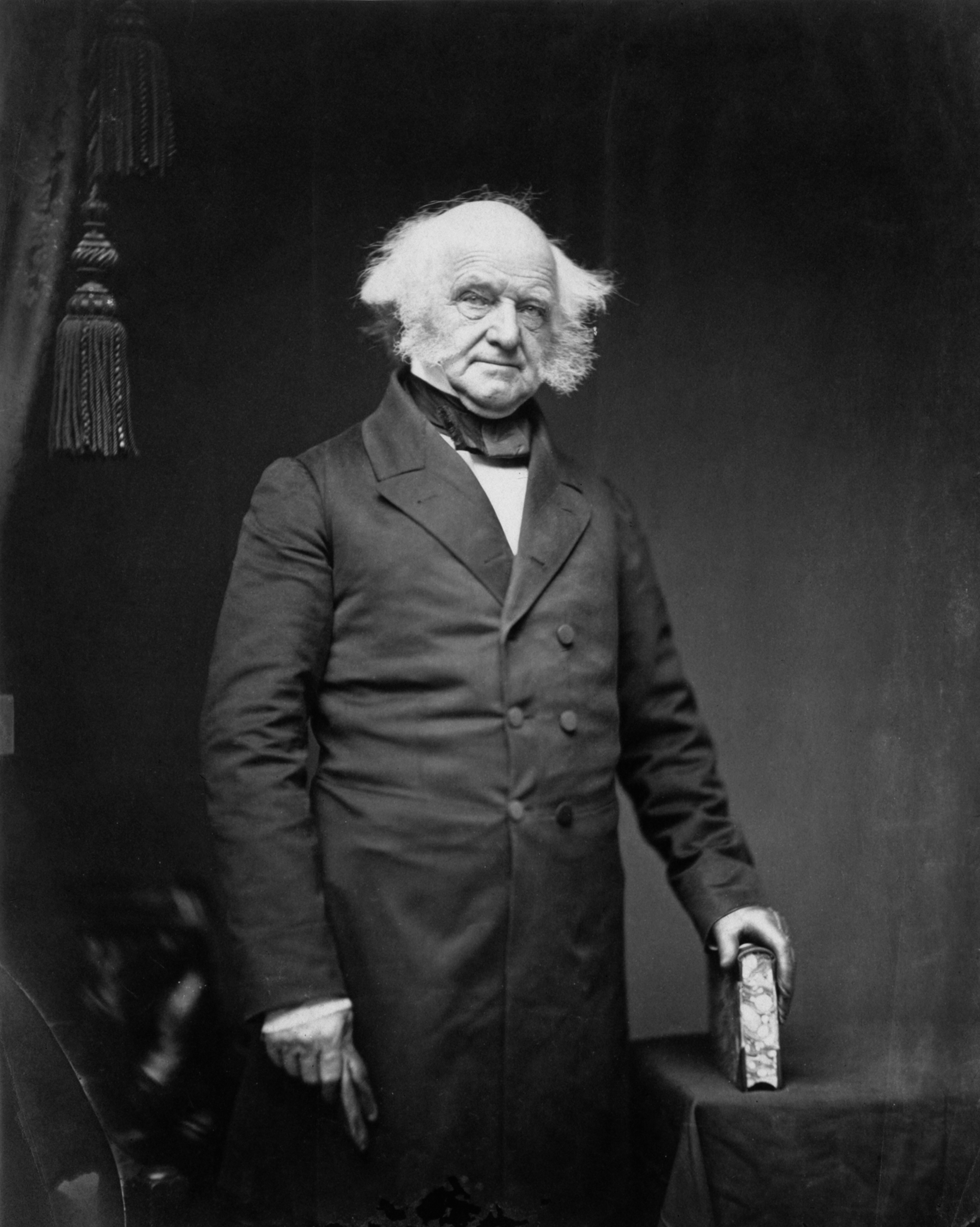
- Photograph by Mathew Brady

President of the United States
- In office March 4, 1837 – March 4, 1841
- Vice President: Richard Mentor Johnson

Vice President of the United States
- In office March 4, 1833 – March 4, 1837

United States Minister to the United Kingdom
- In office August 8, 1831 – April 4, 1832

United States Secretary of State
- In office March 28, 1829 – May 23, 1831

Governor of New York
- In office January 1, 1829 – March 12, 1829

United States Senator from New York
- In office March 4, 1821 – December 20, 1828

Attorney General of New York
- In office February 17, 1815 – July 8, 1819

Member of the New York Senate
- In office 1813–1820

Personal details
- Born: Maarten Van Buren; December 5, 1782 Kinderhook, New York, U.S.
- Died: July 24, 1862 (aged 79) Kinderhook, New York, U.S.
- Party: Democratic-Republican (1799–1825); Free Soil (1848–1852); Democratic (1825–1848, 1852–1862)
- Spouse: Hannah Hoes (m. 1807; died 1819)

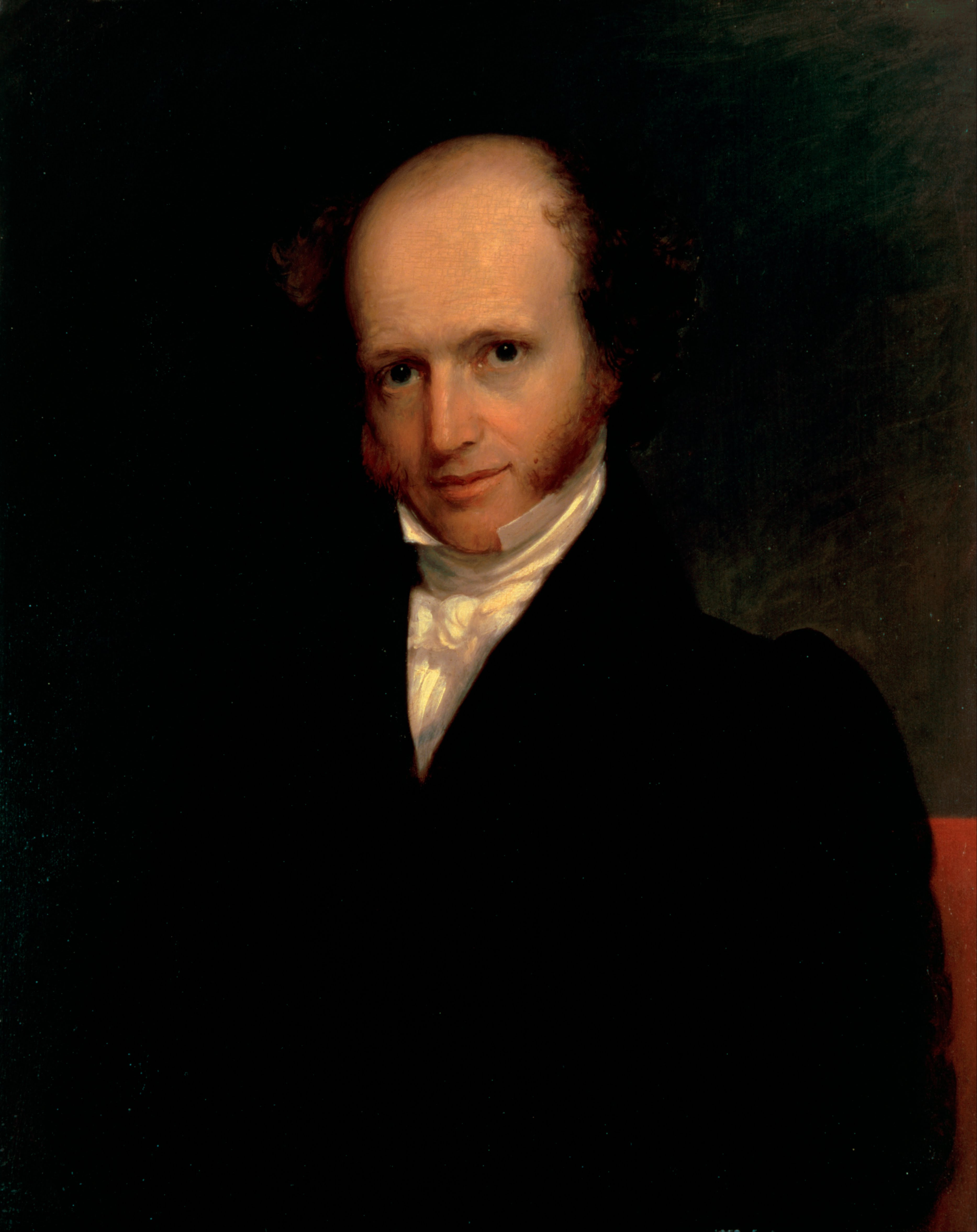
Portrait of Martin Van Buren by Francis Alexander

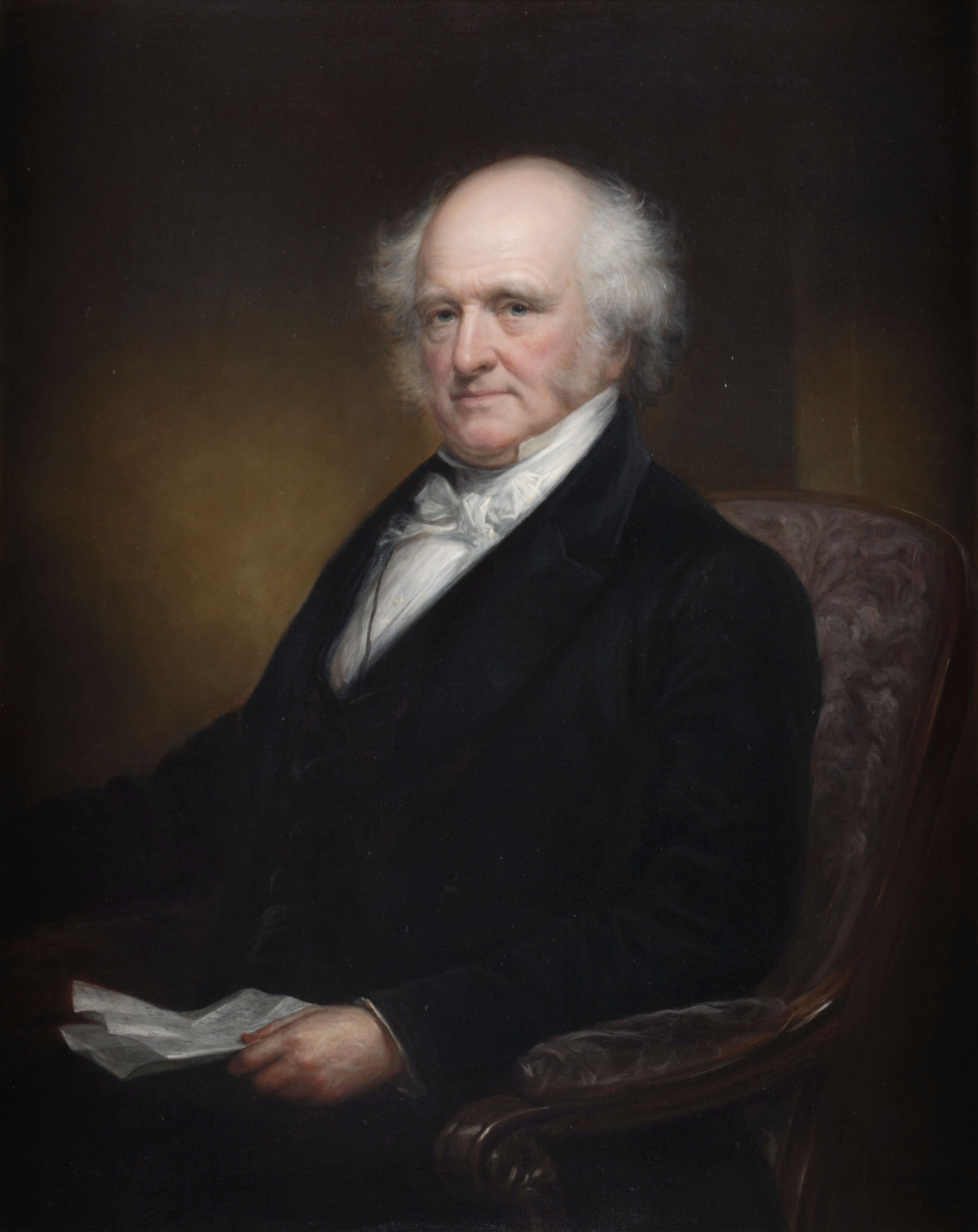
Portrait of Martin Van Buren by Daniel Huntington

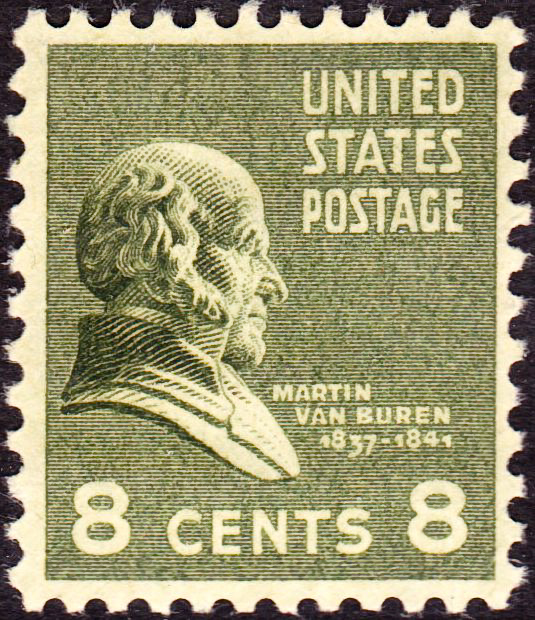
Martin Van Buren 1903 Postage Stamp Issue-8c

This is a select bibliography of Post World War II books and journal articles about Martin Van Buren (December 5, 1782 – July 24, 1862), an American statesman who served as the eighth president of the United States from 1837 to 1841.

He was a founder of the Democratic Party, and served in multiple offices from New York state, including governor, United States Senator, state attorney general, and state senator. Nationally he served under President Andrew Jackson as Minister to Great Britain, United States Secretary of State, and was elected as Vice President of the United States for Jackson's second term. He was elected as the 8th president of the United States in 1836, but lost his 1840 reelection bid to Whig Party nominee William Henry Harrison. Later in life, Van Buren emerged as an elder statesman and an important anti-slavery leader, who led the Free Soil Party ticket in the 1848 presidential election.

Works listed here are cited in the notes or bibliographies of scholarly sources. Each is published by an academic or major press, written by a recognized expert, or substantially reviewed in scholarly journals; borderline cases are omitted. A selection of primary sources are included. Many of the books below carry their own bibliographies; see the Further reading section for other bibliographies, and the External links section for historical sites, academic sites, and museums.

Citations follow APA style. (Note: Entries are in plain text APA 7 format without templates; templates are used only for reviews and notes.) Book have citations to academic journal or mainstream published reviews when available. For books only partly about the subject, relevant chapter or section titles are provided when useful and available. Translators of the original-language edition are included when possible. In cases where a title or name has appeared with more than one English spelling, the most recent published form is used and a footnote documents any earlier title under which the work appeared.

== Biographies ==
- Bradley, James M. (2024). Martin Van Buren: America's First Politician. Oxford: Oxford University Press.
- Cole, Donald B. (1984). Martin Van Buren and the American Political System. Princeton, NJ: Princeton University Press.
- Curtis, James C. (1970). The Fox at Bay: Martin Van Buren and the Presidency, 1837–1841. Lexington, KY: University Press of Kentucky.
- Mushkat, Jerome, & Rayback, Joseph G. (1997). Martin Van Buren: Law, Politics and the Shaping of Republican Ideology. De Kalb, IL: Northern Illinois University Press.
- Niven, John. (1983). Martin Van Buren: The Romantic Age of American Politics. New York, NY: Oxford University Press.
- Remini, Robert V. (1959). Martin Van Buren and the Making of the Democratic Party. New York, NY: Columbia University Press.
- Silbey, Joel H. (2002). Martin Van Buren and the Emergence of American Popular Politics. New York, NY: Rowman & Littlefield.
- Widmer, Ted. (2005). Martin Van Buren: The American Presidents Series: The 8th President, 1837–1841. New York, NY: Times Books.
- Wilson, Major L. (1984). The Presidency of Martin Van Buren. Lawrence KS: University Press of Kansas.

== Books with content about Van Buren ==
- Blue, Frederick J. (1973). The Free Soilers: Third Party Politics, 1848–54. Urbana, IL: University of Illinois Press.
- Brooke, John L. (2010). Chapter 7: Party and Corruption: The Columbia Junto and the Rise of Martin Van Buren, 1799–1812. In Columbia Rising: Civil Life on the Upper Hudson from the Revolution to the Age of Jackson. Chapel Hill, NC: The University of North Carolina Press.
- Bruegel, M. (2002). Farm, Shop, Landing: The Rise of a Market Society in the Hudson Valley, 1780–1860. Durham, NC.: Duke University Press.
- Cheathem, Mark R. (2018). The Coming of Democracy: Presidential Campaigning in the Age of Jackson. Baltimore: Johns Hopkins University Press.
- Cheathem, Mark R. (2023). Who Is James K. Polk? The Presidential Election of 1844. Lawrence: University Press of Kansas.
- Hofstadter, Richard. (1969). The Idea of a Party System. Berkeley, CA: University of California Press.
- Holt, Michael F. (1999). The Rise and Fall of the American Whig Party: Jacksonian Politics and the Onset of the Civil War. New York, NY: Oxford University Press.
- Howe, Daniel Walker. (2007). What Hath God Wrought: The Transformation of America, 1815–1848. New York, NY: Oxford University Press.
- Lepler, Jessica. M. (2013). The Many Panics of 1837: People, Politics, and the Creation of a Transatlantic Financial Crisis. Cambridge, UK: Cambridge University Press.
- Maury, S. (2009). Martin Van Buren. In The Statesmen of America in 1846. Cambridge Library Collection - North American History, pp. 114–139. Cambridge, UK: Cambridge University Press.
- McCormick, Richard P. (1966). The Second American Party System. Chapel Hill, NC: University of North Carolina Press.
- McGrane, Reginald C. (1966). The Panic of 1837: Some Financial Problems of the Jacksonian Era. Chicago, IL: University of Chicago Press.
- Merk, Frederick. (1972). Slavery and the Annexation of Texas. New York, NY: Knopf.
- Rediker, M. B. (2013). The Amistad Rebellion: An Atlantic Odyssey of Slavery and Freedom. London, UK: Verso.
- Richards, Leonard L. (2000). The Slave Power: The Free North and Southern Domination, 1780–1860. Baton Rouge, LA: Louisiana State University Press.
- Roberts, A. (2016). America's First Great Depression: Economic Crisis and Political Disorder after the Panic of 1837. Ithaca, NY: Cornell University Press.
- Schlesinger, Arthur M., Jr. (1953). The Age of Jackson. Boston, MA: Little, Brown and Company.
- Sellers, Charles G. (1992). The Market Revolution: Jacksonian America, 1815–1846. New York, NY: Oxford University Press.
- Temin, Peter. (1969). The Jacksonian Economy. New York, NY: Norton.
- John William Ward 1955. Andrew Jackson, Symbol for an Age. New York: Oxford University Press.
- Watson, Harry. L. (2006). Liberty and Power: The Politics of Jacksonian America. New York, NY: Hill and Wang.

== Journal articles ==
- Adams, S. P. (2011). Hard Times, Loco-Focos, and Buckshot Wars: The Panic of 1837 in Pennsylvania. Pennsylvania Legacies, 11(1), pp. 12–17.
- Cayton, A. (1985). The Debate over the Panama Congress and the Origins of the Second American Party System. The Historian, 47(2), pp. 219–238.
- Curtis, J. (1981). In the Shadow of Old Hickory: The Political Travail of Martin Van Buren. Journal of the Early Republic, 1(3), pp. 249–267.
- Duncan, J. K. (2020). "Plain Catholics of the North": Martin Van Buren and the Politics of Religion, 1807–1836. U.S. Catholic Historian 38(1), pp. 25–48.
- Ford, T., & Weinberg, C. (2009). Slavery, Interracial Marriage, and the Election of 1836. OAH Magazine of History, 23(2), pp. 57–61.
- Friedenberg, A. (1914). The Correspondence of Jews with President Martin Van Buren. Publications of the American Jewish Historical Society, (22), pp. 71–100.
- Harrison, J. (1956). Martin Van Buren and His Southern Supporters. The Journal of Southern History, 22(4), pp. 438–458.
- Hummel, J. (1999). Martin Van Buren: The Greatest American President. The Independent Review, 4(2), pp. 255–281.
- Huston, R. (2004). The "Little Magician" after the Show: Martin Van Buren, Country Gentleman and Progressive Farmer, 1841–1862. New York History, 85(2), pp. 93–121.
- Kohan, C., & Van Buren, S. (1987). Martin Van Buren's Journey Home in 1839: An Account by his Son. New York History, 68(1), pp. 93–99.
- Kruman, M. (1992). The Second American Party System and the Transformation of Revolutionary Republicanism. Journal of the Early Republic, 12(4), pp. 509–537.
- Latner, R. (1978). The Kitchen Cabinet and Andrew Jackson's Advisory System. The Journal of American History, 65(2), pp. 367–388.
- McBride, S. (2016). When Joseph Smith Met Martin Van Buren: Mormonism and the Politics of Religious Liberty in Nineteenth-Century America. Church History, 85(1), pp. 150–158.
- Mintz, M. (1949). The Political Ideas of Martin Van Buren. New York History, 30(4), pp. 422–448.
- Morrison, M. (1995). Martin Van Buren, the Democracy, and the Partisan Politics of Texas Annexation. The Journal of Southern History, 61(4), pp. 695–724.
- Pasley, J. (2007). Minnows, Spies, and Aristocrats: The Social Crisis of Congress in the Age of Martin Van Buren. Journal of the Early Republic, 27(4), pp. 599–653.
- Rayback, J. G. (1954). Martin Van Buren's Desire for Revenge in the Campaign of 1848. The Mississippi Valley Historical Review, 40(4), pp. 707–716.
- ———. (1955). Martin Van Buren's Break with James K. Polk: The Record. New York History, 36(1), pp. 51–62.
- ——— (1980). A Myth Re-Examined: Martin van Buren's Role in the Presidential Election of 1816. Proceedings of the American Philosophical Society, 124(2), pp. 106–118.
- ——— (1983). Martin Van Buren: His Place in the History of New York and the United States. New York History, 64(2), pp. 120–135.
- Remini, R. V. (1958). The Albany Regency. New York History, 39(4), pp. 341–355.
- ———. (1958). Martin Van Buren and the Tariff of Abominations. The American Historical Review, 63(4), pp. 903–917.
- Ritcheson, C. (1986). Van Buren's Mission to London, 1831-1832. The International History Review, 8(2), pp. 190–213.
- Rolater, F. (1993). The American Indian and the Origin of the Second American Party System. The Wisconsin Magazine of History, 76(3), pp. 180–203.
- Roper, D. (1982). Martin Van Buren as Tocqueville's Lawyer: The Jurisprudence of Politics. Journal of the Early Republic, 2(2), pp. 169–189.
- Rousseau, P. (2002). Jacksonian Monetary Policy, Specie Flows, and the Panic of 1837. The Journal of Economic History, 62(2), pp. 457–488.
- Shade, W. (1986). Politics and Parties in Jacksonian America. The Pennsylvania Magazine of History and Biography, 110(4), pp. 483–507.
- ———. (1998). "The Most Delicate and Exciting Topics": Martin Van Buren, Slavery, and the Election of 1836. Journal of the Early Republic, 18(3), pp. 459–484.
- Williams, W. (1965). Ten Letters From William Harris Crawford To Martin Van Buren. The Georgia Historical Quarterly, 49(1), pp. 65–81.
- ———. (1983). Lincoln and Van Buren in the Steps of the Fathers: Another Look at the Lyceum Address. Civil War History. 29(3), pp. 197–211.
- ———. (1988). Republicanism and the Idea of Party in the Jacksonian Period. Journal of the Early Republic, 8(4), pp. 419–442.

== Books, papers, and speeches by Martin Van Buren ==
Collected Papers and Speeches

- The Papers of Martin Van Buren at Cumberland University
- The American Presidency Project - The Papers of Martin Van Buren (Online Collection) at University of California, Santa Barbara
- Richardson, J. D. (2010). Martin Van Buren: A Compilation Of The Messages And Papers Of The Presidents. Whitefish, MT: Kessinger Publishing.

Individual Papers and Speeches

- March 4, 1837: Inaugural Address
- March 28, 1837: Proclamation 43C—Extinguishing Title for Indian Lands Between the State of Missouri and the Missouri River.
- June 27, 1837: State of Maine - Resolves Relative to the Northeastern Boundary.
- December 5, 1837: First Annual Message.
- January 5, 1838: Proclamation 45A—Neutrality With Respect to Canadian Affairs.
- November 21, 1838: Proclamation—Neutrality With Respect to Canadian Affairs.
- December 3, 1838: Second Annual Message.
- December 2, 1839: Third Annual Message.
- December 5, 1840: Fourth Annual Message.

Books by Van Buren

- Inquiry Into the Origin and Course of Political Parties in the United States. (Note: Edited by Abraham Van Buren and John Van Buren. Published in 1867 by Hurd and Houghton, New York. Text available from Project Guttenberg.)
- The Autobiography of Martin Van Buren. (Note: Edited by John Clement Fitzpatrick. Published in 1919 in the Fourteenth Report of the Historical Manuscripts Commission, by the American Historical Association, Washington D.C.)

== See also ==
- Family of Martin Van Buren
- Presidency of Andrew Jackson
- 1832 Democratic National Convention
- 1832 United States presidential election
- 1835 Democratic National Convention
- 1836 United States presidential election
- Presidency of Martin Van Buren
- Panic of 1837
- United States v. The Amistad
- 1840 Democratic National Convention
- 1840 United States presidential election
