= Bibliography of James K. Polk =

James K. Polk
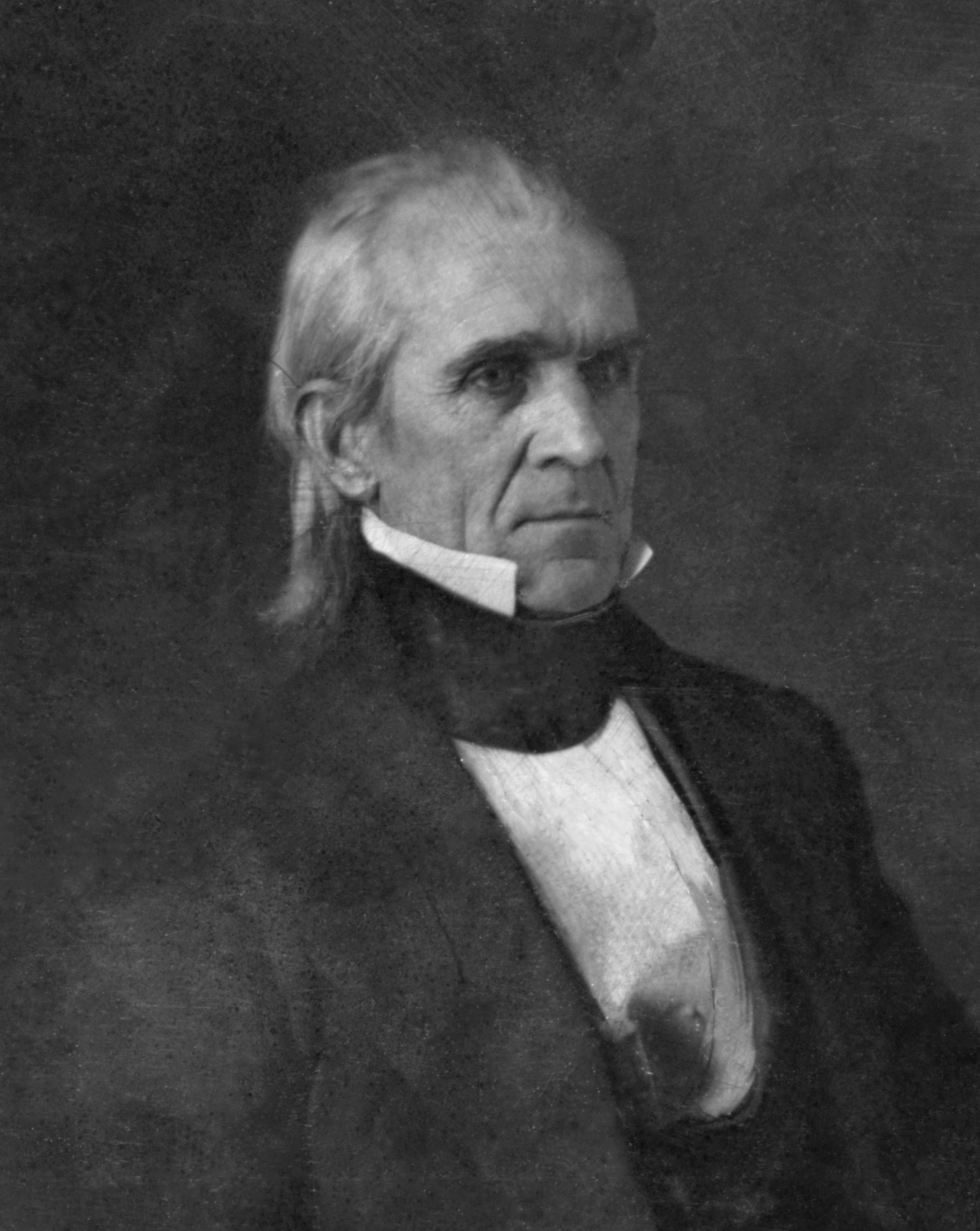
- Portrait, c. 1849

11th President of the United States
- In office March 4, 1845 – March 4, 1849
- Vice President: George M. Dallas
- Preceded by: John Tyler
- Succeeded by: Zachary Taylor

9th Governor of Tennessee
- In office October 14, 1839 – October 15, 1841

13th Speaker of the United States House of Representatives
- In office December 7, 1835 – March 3, 1839

Chair of the House Ways and Means Committee
- In office March 4, 1833 – March 4, 1835

Member of the U.S. House of Representatives from Tennessee
- In office March 4, 1825 – March 3, 1839
- Preceded by: John Alexander Cocke
- Succeeded by: Harvey Magee Watterson
- Constituency: 6th district (1825–1833); 9th district (1833–1839)

Personal details
- Born: James Knox Polk; November 2, 1795 Pineville, North Carolina, U.S.
- Died: June 15, 1849 (aged 53) Nashville, Tennessee, U.S.
- Party: Democratic
- Spouse: Sarah Childress (m. 1824)
- Education: University of North Carolina at Chapel Hill
- Nicknames: Young Hickory; Napoleon of the Stump

Military service
- Branch/service: Tennessee militia
- Years of service: 1821–1825
- Rank: Captain
- Unit: Maury County Cavalry

This is a select bibliography of academic level books and journal articles, published mainly after World War II, (Note: Works published during or before World War II should be limited to areas where there are no significant post-World War II books on the subject or when the work in question has significant historical merit.) about the history of James K. Polk and his historical context.

James Knox Polk (November 2, 1795 – June 15, 1849) was the 11th president of the United States, serving from 1845 to 1849. A protégé of Andrew Jackson and a member of the Democratic Party during the Second Party System, he was an advocate of American expansionism and Jacksonian democracy. The Republic of Texas joined the Union in his first year in office, one of the causes that soon led the U.S. into the Mexican–American War. The settlement of the war expanded United States territory to the Pacific Ocean including Alta California. During his term, the dispute over the Oregon Territory with the United Kingdom was resolved in the Oregon Treaty, creating the present U.S.-Canadian boundary.

Works listed here are cited in the notes or bibliographies of scholarly sources. Each is published by an academic or major press, written by a recognized expert, or substantially reviewed in scholarly journals; borderline cases are omitted. A selection of primary sources are included. Many of the books below carry their own bibliographies; see the Further reading section for other bibliographies, and the External links section for historical sites, academic sites, and museums.

Citations follow APA style. (Note: Entries are in plain text APA 7 format without templates; templates are used only for reviews and notes.) Book have citations to academic journal or mainstream published reviews when available. For books only partly about the subject, relevant chapter or section titles are provided when useful and available. Translators of the original-language edition are included when possible. In cases where a title or name has appeared with more than one English spelling, the most recent published form is used and a footnote documents any earlier title under which the work appeared.

== General surveys ==
- Bergeron, P. H. (1987). The presidency of James K. Polk. University Press of Kansas.
- Borneman, W. R. (2008). Polk: The man who transformed the presidency and America. Random House.
- Byrnes, M. E. (2001). James K. Polk: A biographical companion. ABC-CLIO.
- Chaffin, T. (2014). Met his every goal? James K. Polk and the legends of manifest destiny. University of Tennessee Press.
- Haynes, S. W. (1997). James K. Polk and the expansionist impulse. Longman.
- Jenkins, J. S. (1850). The life of James Knox Polk, late president of the United States. James M. Alden.
- Leonard, T. M. (2001). James K. Polk: A clear and unquestionable destiny. SR Books.
- McCormac, E. I. (1922). James K. Polk: A political biography. University of California Press.
- Merry, R. W. (2009). A country of vast designs: James K. Polk, the Mexican War, and the conquest of the American continent. Simon & Schuster.
- Rawley, J. A. (2000). Polk, James Knox (1795–1849), eleventh president of the United States. In American national biography online. Oxford University Press. doi:10.1093/anb/9780198606697.article.0400795
- Seigenthaler, J. (2004). James K. Polk. Times Books.
- Sellers, C. G., Jr. (1957). James K. Polk, Jacksonian, 1795–1843. Princeton University Press.
- Sellers, C. G., Jr. (1966). James K. Polk, continentalist, 1843–1846. Princeton University Press.

== Private life and family ==
- Angellotti, Mrs. Frank M. (April 1923). "The Polks of North Carolina and Tennessee". The New England Historical and Genealogical Register. LXXVII (306). Boston: New England Historic Genealogical Society: 133–144. ISSN 0028-4785. LCCN 05016188. OCLC 7030049.
- Bergeron, P. H. (1967). My brother's keeper: William H. Polk goes to school. North Carolina Historical Review, 44(2), 188–204. JSTOR 23518042
- Bumgarner, J. R. (1997). Sarah Childress Polk: A biography of the remarkable first lady. McFarland.
- Cohen, M. D. (2013). James K. Polk and the mystery of Amor Patriæ. New England Quarterly, 86(2), 266–292. JSTOR 43284991
- Goodpasture, A. V. (1921). The boyhood of President Polk. Tennessee Historical Magazine, 7(1), 36–50. JSTOR 42637461
- Greenberg, A. S. (2019). Lady first: The world of First Lady Sarah Polk. Alfred A. Knopf.
- Horn, S. F. (1945). Young James K. Polk's credentials. Tennessee Historical Quarterly, 4(4), 339–340. JSTOR 42620876
- Ikard, R. W. (1984). Surgical operation on James K. Polk by Ephraim McDowell or the search for Polk's gallstone. Tennessee Historical Quarterly, 43(2), 121–131. JSTOR 42626441
- Palmer-Mehta, V. (2016). Sarah Polk: Ideas of her own. In K. A. S. Sibley (Ed.), A companion to first ladies (pp. 159–175). Wiley Blackwell. doi:10.1002/9781118732250.ch10
- Polk, W. R. (2000). Polk's folly: An American family history. Doubleday.
- Rumsch, B. (2016). James K. Polk. ABDO.
- Sellers, C. G. (1952). Jim Polk goes to Chapel Hill. North Carolina Historical Review, 29(2), 189–203. JSTOR 23516536
- Sellers, C. G. (1953). Colonel Ezekiel Polk: Pioneer and patriarch. William and Mary Quarterly, 10(1), 80–98. JSTOR 2936878
- Weaver, H., & Eidson, W. G. (1965). The James K. Polk home. Tennessee Historical Quarterly, 24(1), 3–19. JSTOR 42622792
- West, E. I. (1967). Religion in the life of James K. Polk. Tennessee Historical Quarterly, 26(4), 357–371. JSTOR 42622969

== Political life ==
- Bergeron, P. H. (1982). James K. Polk and the Jacksonian press in Tennessee. Tennessee Historical Quarterly, 41(3), 257–277. JSTOR 42626299
- Moore, P. (1951). James K. Polk: Tennessee politician. Journal of Southern History, 17(4), 493–516. JSTOR 2954513
- Pukl, J. M., Jr. (1980). James K. Polk's early congressional campaigns of 1825 and 1827. Tennessee Historical Quarterly, 39(4), 440–458. JSTOR 42626127
- Pukl, J. M., Jr. (1981). James K. Polk's congressional campaigns, 1829–1833. Tennessee Historical Quarterly, 40(4), 348–365. JSTOR 42626232
- Pukl, J. M., Jr. (1982). James K. Polk's congressional campaigns of 1835 and 1837. Tennessee Historical Quarterly, 41(2), 105–123. JSTOR 42626275
- Watson, E. L. (1964). James Walker of Columbia, Polk's critic and compatriot. Tennessee Historical Quarterly, 23(1), 24–37. JSTOR 42621663
- Williams, F. B., Jr. (1965). Samuel Hervey Laughlin, Polk's political handyman. Tennessee Historical Quarterly, 24(4), 356–392. JSTOR 42622843

=== The election of 1844 ===
- Cheathem, M. R. (2023). Who is James K. Polk? The presidential election of 1844. University Press of Kansas.
- Eisenhower, J. S. D. (1994). The election of James K. Polk, 1844. Tennessee Historical Quarterly, 53(2), 74–87. JSTOR 42628370
- Pecquet, G. M., & Thies, C. F. (2006). Texas treasury notes and the election of 1844. Independent Review, 11(2), 237–260. JSTOR 24562226
- Persinger, C. E. (1914). The "bargain of 1844" as the origin of the Wilmot Proviso. Quarterly of the Oregon Historical Society, 15(3), 137–146. JSTOR 20609962
- Rayback, J. G. (1955). Martin Van Buren's break with James K. Polk: The record. New York History, 36(1), 51–62. JSTOR 23154365
- Theisen, L. S. (1971). James K. Polk, not so dark a horse. Tennessee Historical Quarterly, 30(4), 383–401. JSTOR 42623261
- Volpe, V. L. (1991). The Liberty Party and Polk's election, 1844. The Historian, 53(4), 691–710. JSTOR 24448523

=== The presidency ===
- Bergeron, P. H. (1985). President Polk and economic legislation. Presidential Studies Quarterly, 15(4), 782–795. JSTOR 27550277
- Bergeron, P. H. (1987). All in the family: President Polk in the White House. Tennessee Historical Quarterly, 46(1), 10–20. JSTOR 42626641
- Bonner, J. C. (1968). Andrew Jackson comments on Polk's cabinet. Tennessee Historical Quarterly, 27(3), 287–288. JSTOR 42623028
- Calabresi, S. G., & Yoo, C. S. (2008). The unitary executive: Presidential power from Washington to Bush. Yale University Press.
- Campbell, K. K., & Jamieson, K. H. (1990). Deeds done in words: Presidential rhetoric and the genres of governance. University of Chicago Press.
- Campbell, K. K. (2008). James Knox Polk: The first imperial president? In M. J. Medhurst (Ed.), Before the rhetorical presidency (pp. 83–105). Texas A&M University Press.
- Curran, D. J. (1997). Polk, politics, and patronage: The rejection of George W. Woodward's nomination to the Supreme Court. Pennsylvania Magazine of History and Biography, 121(3), 163–199. JSTOR 20093131
- Currie, D. P., & Kadens, E. E. (2004). President Polk on internal improvements: The undelivered veto. Green Bag 2d, 8, 75–97.
- Cutler, W. (1995). Jackson, Polk, and Johnson: Defenders of the moral economy. Tennessee Historical Quarterly, 54(3), 178–189. JSTOR 42627210
- Devoti, J. (2006). The patriotic business of seeking office: James K. Polk and the patronage. University Press of America.
- Graebner, N. A. (1952). James K. Polk: A study in federal patronage. Mississippi Valley Historical Review, 38(4), 613–632. JSTOR 1892840
- Greenstein, F. I. (2010). The policy-driven leadership of James K. Polk: Making the most of a weak presidency. Presidential Studies Quarterly, 40(4), 725–733. doi:10.1111/j.1741-5705.2010.03808.x
- Heidt, S. J. (2016). Presidential power and national violence: James K. Polk's rhetorical transfer of savagery. Rhetoric and Public Affairs, 19(3), 365–396. doi:10.14321/rhetpublaffa.19.3.0365
- Learned, H. B. (1924). The sequence of appointments to Polk's original cabinet: A study in chronology, 1844–1845. American Historical Review, 30(1), 76–83. JSTOR 1838167
- Lee, R. C., Jr. (2002). Justifying empire: Pericles, Polk, and a dilemma of democratic leadership. Polity, 34(4), 503–531. doi:10.1086/POLv34n4ms3235415
- McCoy, C. A. (1960). Polk and the presidency. University of Texas Press.
- Nau, H. R. (2013). James K. Polk: Manifest destiny. In Conservative internationalism: Armed diplomacy under Jefferson, Polk, Truman, and Reagan (pp. 110–146). Princeton University Press. JSTOR j.ctvc77cnp.10
- Rohrs, R. C. (2004). "Public attention for ... essentially private matters": Women seeking assistance from President James K. Polk. Journal of the Early Republic, 24(1), 107–123. JSTOR 4141424
- Rowe, C. (2020). American society through the prism of the Walker Tariff of 1846. Economic Affairs, 40(2), 180–197. doi:10.1111/ecaf.12404
- White, L. D. (1954). The Jacksonians: A study in administrative history, 1829–1861. Macmillan.
- Williams, F. J. (2020). James K. Polk. In K. Gormley (Ed.), The presidents and the Constitution, Volume One: From the Founding Fathers to the Progressive Era (pp. 149–158). New York University Press. doi:10.18574/nyu/9781479802098.003.0014

== Expansion ==
=== Texas and Oregon ===
- Barker, E. C. (1946). The annexation of Texas. Southwestern Historical Quarterly, 50(1), 49–74. JSTOR 30237259
- Chaffin, T. (1995). "Sons of Washington": Narciso López, filibustering, and U.S. nationalism, 1848–1851. Journal of the Early Republic, 15(1), 79–108. JSTOR 3124384
- Haynes, S. W., & Morris, C. (Eds.). (1997). Manifest destiny and empire: American antebellum expansionism. Texas A&M University Press.
- Judson, K. B. (1919). Polk and Oregon—with a Pakenham letter. Quarterly of the Oregon Historical Society, 20(3), 301–302. JSTOR 20610143
- Merk, F. (1963). Manifest destiny and mission in American history: A reinterpretation. Alfred A. Knopf.
- Merk, F. (1966). The Monroe Doctrine and American expansionism, 1843–1849. Alfred A. Knopf.
- Miles, E. A. (1957). "Fifty-four forty or fight"—An American political legend. Mississippi Valley Historical Review, 44(2), 291–309. JSTOR 1887191
- Morrison, M. A. (1990). Westward the curse of empire: Texas annexation and the American Whig Party. Journal of the Early Republic, 10(2), 221–249. JSTOR 3123558
- Pletcher, D. M. (1973). The diplomacy of annexation: Texas, Oregon, and the Mexican War. University of Missouri Press.
- Rathbun, L. (2001). The debate over annexing Texas and the emergence of Manifest Destiny. Rhetoric and Public Affairs, 4(3), 459–494. JSTOR 41940591
- Schroeder, J. H. (1985). Annexation or independence: The Texas issue in American politics, 1836–1845. Southwestern Historical Quarterly, 89(2), 137–164. JSTOR 30239906
- Schuyler, R. L. (1911). Polk and the Oregon compromise of 1846. Political Science Quarterly, 26(3), 443–461. JSTOR 2140965
- Silbey, J. H. (2005). Storm over Texas: The annexation controversy and the road to Civil War. Oxford University Press.
- Stenberg, R. R. (1934). President Polk and the annexation of Texas. Southwestern Social Science Quarterly, 14(4), 333–356. JSTOR 42864918
- Sturdevant, P. E. (2005). Robert John Walker and Texas annexation: A lost champion. Southwestern Historical Quarterly, 109(2), 188–202. JSTOR 30242264
- Volanto, K. J., & Preuss, G. B. (2019). When was the Republic of Texas no more? Revisiting the annexation of Texas. Southwestern Historical Quarterly, 123(1), 30–59. JSTOR 26745573
- Weinberg, A. K. (1935). Manifest destiny: A study of nationalist expansionism in American history. Johns Hopkins Press.
- Woodworth, S. E. (2010). Manifest destinies: America's westward expansion and the road to the Civil War. Alfred A. Knopf.

=== Related ===
- Conniff, M. L. (2001). Panama and the United States: The forced alliance (2nd ed.). University of Georgia Press.
- Morrison, M. A. (1995). Martin Van Buren, the Democracy, and the partisan politics of Texas annexation. Journal of Southern History, 61(4), 695–724. JSTOR 2211431
- Randall, S. J. (1992). Colombia and the United States: Hegemony and interdependence. University of Georgia Press.

== Slavery ==
- Dusinberre, W. (2002). President Polk and the politics of slavery. American Nineteenth Century History, 3(1), 1–16. doi:10.1080/713998976
- Dusinberre, W. (2003). Slavemaster president: The double career of James Polk. Oxford University Press.
- Foner, E. (1969). The Wilmot Proviso revisited. Journal of American History, 56(2), 262–279. JSTOR 1908123
- Fuller, J. D. P. (1935). Slavery propaganda during the Mexican War. Southwestern Historical Quarterly, 38(4), 235–245. JSTOR 30235528
- Rayback, J. G. (1970). Free soil: The election of 1848. University Press of Kentucky.
- Stenberg, R. R. (1932). The motivation of the Wilmot Proviso. Mississippi Valley Historical Review, 18(4), 535–548. JSTOR 1898562
- Wilson, M. L. (1968). Manifest Destiny and free soil: The triumph of negative liberalism in the 1840s. The Historian, 31(1), 36–56. JSTOR 24440954
- Wilson, M. L. (1970). Ideological fruits of Manifest Destiny: The geopolitics of slavery expansion in the crisis of 1850. Journal of the Illinois State Historical Society, 63(2), 132–157. JSTOR 40190861

== Background ==
The below items contain significant information about James K. Polk or significant background and context for his life and presidency.

- Eyal, Y. (2007). The Young America movement and the transformation of the Democratic Party, 1828–1861. Cambridge University Press.
- Holt, M. F. (1978). The political crisis of the 1850s. John Wiley & Sons.
- Howe, D. W. (2007). What hath God wrought: The transformation of America, 1815–1848. Oxford University Press.
- Kornblith, G. J. (2003). Rethinking the coming of the Civil War: A counterfactual exercise. Journal of American History, 90(1), 76–105. JSTOR 3659792
- McPherson, J. M. (1988). Battle cry of freedom: The Civil War era. Oxford University Press.
- Paul, J. C. N. (1951). Rift in the democracy: The little-known story of political personalities and intrigue in the annexation of Texas which led to the Civil War. University of Pennsylvania Press.
- Remini, R. V. (1984). Andrew Jackson and the course of American democracy, 1833–1845. Harper & Row.
- Wilentz, S. (2005). The rise of American democracy: Jefferson to Lincoln. W. W. Norton.

== Historiography ==
- Horn, J. J. (1965). Trends in historical interpretation: James K. Polk. North Carolina Historical Review, 42(4), 454–464. JSTOR 23517672
- Notaro, C. (2016). Biography and James K. Polk: Observations on an historiography spanning two centuries. Tennessee Historical Quarterly, 75(4), 260–275. JSTOR 26540253
- Nugent, W. (2007). The American habit of empire, and the cases of Polk and Bush. Western Historical Quarterly, 38(1), 4–24. JSTOR 25443457
- Thweatt, J. H. (1974). The James K. Polk papers. Tennessee Historical Quarterly, 33(1), 93–98. JSTOR 42623431

== Reference works ==
- Graff, H. F. (Ed.). (2002). The presidents: A reference history (3rd ed.). Charles Scribner's Sons.
- Silbey, J. H. (Ed.). (2014). A companion to the antebellum presidents, 1837–1861. Wiley Blackwell.

== Primary sources ==
- Appleton, J. (1986). North for Union: John Appleton's journal of a tour to New England made by President Polk in June and July 1847 (W. Cutler, Ed.). Vanderbilt University Press.
- Emory, W. H. (1848). Notes of a military reconnoissance, from Fort Leavenworth, in Missouri, to San Diego, in California, including parts of the Arkansas, Del Norte, and Gila rivers (30th Cong., 1st Sess., H. Exec. Doc. No. 41).
- Jenkins, J. S. (1850). The life of James Knox Polk, late president of the United States. James M. Alden.
- McClellan, G. B. (1917). The Mexican War diary of George B. McClellan (W. S. Myers, Ed.). Princeton University Press.
- O'Sullivan, J. L. (1845). Annexation. United States Magazine and Democratic Review, 17(85), 5–9.
- Polk, J. K. (1910). The diary of James K. Polk during his presidency, 1845–1849 (M. M. Quaife, Ed.; Vols. 1–4). A. C. McClurg.
- Polk, J. K. (1929). Polk: The diary of a president, 1845–1849: Covering the Mexican War, the acquisition of Oregon, and the conquest of California and the Southwest (A. Nevins, Ed.). Longmans, Green.
- Polk, J. K. (1845, March 4). Inaugural address of James Knox Polk. The Avalon Project, Lillian Goldman Law Library, Yale Law School.
- Polk, J. K. (n.d.). James K. Polk papers, 1775–1891 [Manuscript collection]. Manuscript Division, Library of Congress.
- Richardson, J. D. (Comp.). (1896–1899). A compilation of the messages and papers of the presidents, 1789–1897 (Vols. 1–10). Government Printing Office.
- Thom, A. (1844). The claims to the Oregon territory considered. Smith, Elder.
- U.S. House of Representatives. (1848). Journal of the House of Representatives of the United States, 30th Congress. U.S. Government Printing Office. (Note: Site also contains Congressional records for terms Polk served in the House of Representatives.)
- Weaver, H., Cutler, W., Chaffin, T., & Cohen, M. D. (Eds.). (2021). Correspondence of James K. Polk: Digital edition. University of Virginia Press.
- Weaver, H., Cutler, W., Chaffin, T., & Cohen, M. D. (Eds.). (1969–2020). Correspondence of James K. Polk (Vols. 1–14). Vanderbilt University Press; University of Tennessee Press.
- James K. Polk's Personal Correspondence Shapell Manuscript Foundation
- Inaugural Address of James K. Polk from The Avalon Project at the Yale Law School
- James K. Polk Presidential Papers Collection, The American Presidency Project at the University of California, Santa Barbara
- United States Congress. "Bibliography of James K. Polk (id: P000409)". Biographical Directory of the United States Congress.

== See also ==
- Jacksonian democracy
- Manifest destiny
- Bibliography of Zachary Taylor
