= Kinderhook Village District =

Historic district in New York, United States

- U.S. National Register of Historic Places
- U.S. Historic district
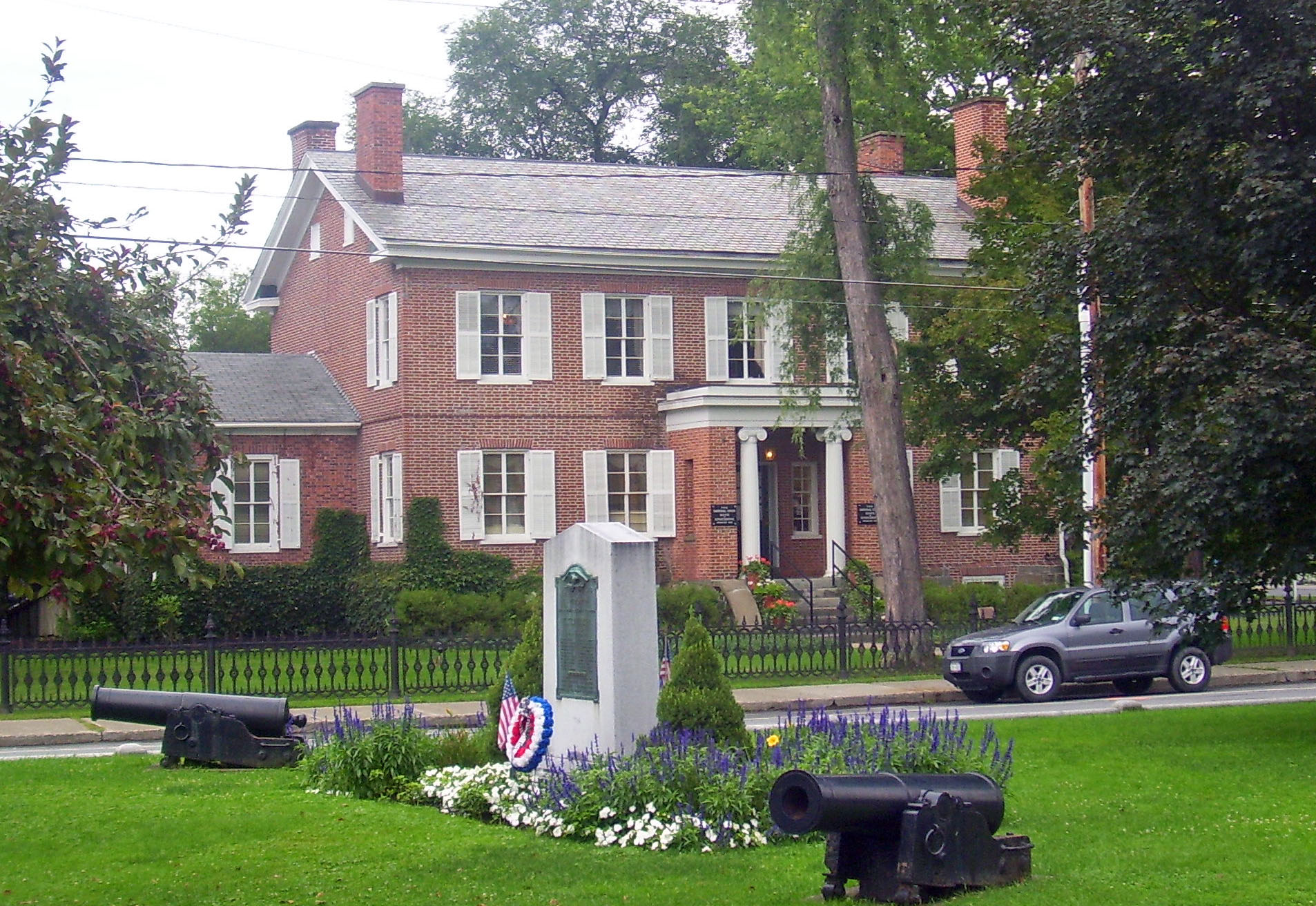
- Main square looking north, 2008

- Location within New York Location within the United States
- Interactive map showing Kinderhook Village District
- Location: Kinderhook, New York
- Nearest city: Hudson
- Coordinates: 42°23′42″N 73°41′53″W
- Area: 612 acres (248 ha)
- Built: 1713-1850
- Architectural style: Federal, Greek Revival, Gothic Revival
- NRHP reference No.: 74001227
- Added to NRHP: July 24, 1974

The Kinderhook Village District is located in the central areas of the village of Kinderhook, New York, United States. It is a 612-acre (248 ha) area covering both developed and undeveloped land centered on US 9.

It contains many buildings from the 18th and 19th centuries, some of which were associated with Martin Van Buren, a native of the town who later became President. In 1974 it was listed on the National Register of Historic Places.

== Geography ==
The district takes up most of the southeastern half of the village. Kinderhook Creek, the village's eastern line, is also the district's eastern boundary. It deviates from the village boundary in the north to cross to Chatham Street (Route 9) near the intersection with the old railroad right-of-way, which it follows down to Railroad Avenue and then turns west along the back property lines of homes on Albany Avenue.

It follows those lot lines to the cemeteries and crosses Albany to follow Sunset Avenue, which divides residences from farmers' fields to the south. It turns to follow the right-of-way when it intersects it again, then turning east again at the rear property line of residences on Rothermel Lane. When that route reaches the rear line of houses on Broad Street (Route 9), it follows them south to Gaffney Lane, where it crosses the street to the rear lines of a subdivision on Presidential Drive. From the end of that it goes back to the creek.

This boundary includes as well all of the properties along Church, Hudson, Sylvester and William streets, Jarvis and Maiden lanes and Kinderknoll Drive. With the exception of the village square at Albany, Broad, Chatham and Hudson streets, these areas are residential. The large eastern area of the district, taking in the flatlands along the creek, is undeveloped open space except for the Hudson Street corridor. As of the district's listing on the Register, there were 250 buildings within it, most of which predate the 20th century.

== History ==
Kinderhook's history began in the mid-17th century when Dutch farmers from the colonial capital at Fort Orange in present-day Albany moved south in search of fertile land. Some found it in the flatlands along the bend of the creek that bounds the village, and the nearby bluff proved a good place for building. The Cornelius Schermerhorn House at 33 Broad Street, built in four stages from 1713 to 1770, is the most prominent building in Kinderhook surviving from this time. The gambrel roofs at the John Pruyn House (26 William Street) and 15 Hudson Street, with a muizetanden pattern in the brick of its gable endm also survive.

By 1763 there were 15 buildings and a Dutch Reformed Church. David van Schaack's two-story brick home at 24 Broad Street inaugurated a new era when it was built in 1774. Described as being "like a castle", it had neoclassical proportions and a Palladian window, features typical of a country gentleman's home of that era. The decorative touches would be widely emulated on other more modest homes in the village, like 29 Hudson Street.

The Albany Post Road, the forerunner of US 9 in the Hudson Valley, was routed through the village due to its excellent network of existing roads, and that helped open a connection to the Hudson River at Stuyvesant to the west, allowing farmers to ship more of their produce south to New York City. By 1813 the village had 20-30 buildings, including the beginning of a commercial center. New houses of this time were in the Federal style, and again the village had a strong example: the James Vanderpoel House at 16 Broad Street.

More land was cultivated, and the village grew explosively during the 1820s. By 1836, on the eve of Kinderhook's incorporation as a village and the Van Buren Administration, it had 86 buildings and was considered the county's business center. New buildings of this era flirted with the Greek Revival and Carpenter Gothic styles then in vogue. The former is best exemplified by the frame house at 29 Broad Street, with pilasters framing its main entrance. St. Paul's Episcopal Church at 8 Sylvester Street, and the board-and-batten–sided cottage at 28 Albany Avenue are likewise the most prominent Gothic buildings in the village. As with the earlier Georgian stylings, the ornamentation seems to have been widely emulated around the village.

After 1850, the growth slowed down. Following his Free Soil Party campaign of 1848, Van Buren retired permanently to Lindenwald, his estate south of the village. The railroads had come and bypassed Kinderhook for other communities in the area, depriving it of the catalyst they provided. Agriculture continued to be the centerpiece of the village's economy, but it merely remained stable instead of continuing to expand. Most construction during this period took place in the village's center. The row of commercial buildings on Hudson Street there replaced predecessors destroyed in an 1880 fire.

The absence of any railroad-related redevelopment allowed Kinderhook to retain its historic character. This has continued through the 20th and 21st centuries; there have been very few changes to the village during that time.

== See also ==
- Persons of Color Cemetery at Kinderhook, located just to the north and west of the historic district, listed on the National Register in 2016.
