= Attorney General Van Buren =

Attorney General Van Buren may refer to:

- John Van Buren (1810–1866), Attorney General of New York
- Martin Van Buren (1782–1862), Attorney General of New York
