= George P. Barker =

American politician (1807–1848)

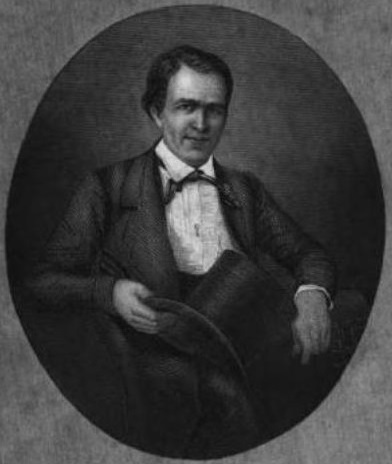

New York State Attorney General
- In office 1842–1845
- Governor: William H. Seward; William C. Bouck; Silas Wright
- Preceded by: Willis Hall
- Succeeded by: John Van Buren

Member of the New York State Assembly from Erie County
- In office January 1, 1836 – December 31, 1836 Serving with Wells Brooks
- Preceded by: William A. Moseley; Ralph Plumb
- Succeeded by: Squire S. Case; Benjamin O. Bivins; Elisha Smith

Personal details
- Born: George Payson Barker; October 25, 1807 Rindge, New Hampshire
- Died: January 27, 1848 (aged 40) Buffalo, New York
- Party: Jacksonian; Democrat
- Spouse: Abby Coit (m. 1834)
- Education: Amherst College
- Alma mater: Union College

Military service
- Branch/service: New York State Militia
- Years of service: 1838-1842
- Rank: Brigadier general

George Payson Barker (October 25, 1807 – January 27, 1848) was an American lawyer and politician. He was most notable for serving in the New York State Assembly in 1836 and New York State Attorney General from 1842 to 1845.

== Early life ==
Barker was born on October 25, 1807, in Rindge, Cheshire County, New Hampshire. He was the youngest of four children born to William Barker and Sarah (née Payson) Barker, and the only child to live to maturity. He attended Amherst College from 1823 to 1826, and then entered Union College from which he graduated in 1827, along with Preston King, later a U.S. Representative and U.S. Senator from New York.

== Career ==
While in college, he studied law with Alonzo C. Paige at Schenectady, New York, after graduating he studied law with Stephen G. Austin at Buffalo, and was admitted to the bar in 1830. He practiced law in partnership with Austin until 1832, then with John T. Hudson until 1836. From 1837 to 1839, he practiced law with Seth E. Sill and Seth C. Hawley, then with Sill only until July 1847, and finally with George Coit Jr.

=== Political career ===
In 1828, he entered politics joining the Jacksonians, and later becoming a Democrat. In June 1829, he was appointed Clerk of the Village of Buffalo. In 1831 he ran for the Assembly, but was defeated by the Anti-Masonic candidates. In 1832, he was appointed first Attorney of the City of Buffalo, later District Attorney of Erie County which office he resigned in December 1836. In 1834, he ran for Congress but was defeated by the Anti-Masonic candidate Thomas C. Love.

He was a member from Erie County of the New York State Assembly in 1836. On January 31, 1838, he was commissioned a captain in the New York State Militia, on February 12 he was elected a major, on August 14 a lieutenant colonel, and in June 1839 brigadier general of the 8th Brigade, retiring from the militia when he was elected Attorney General in 1842. In 1840, he ran for Mayor of Buffalo, New York, but was defeated by the Whig candidate Sheldon Thompson in a close race: 1135 for Thompson, 1125 for Barker. He was New York State Attorney General from 1842 to 1845. From 1846 to 1847, he was again District Attorney of Erie County.

== Personal life ==
On June 25, 1834, he was married to Abby Coit (1806–1874), a daughter of Benjamin Coit and Sarah (née Coit) Coit. Together, they were the parents of:

- George Payson Barker Jr. (1835–1868)
- Sarah Coit Barker (1842–1916), who married Edward Nathan Gibbs (1841–1900) on September 5, 1867, in Norwich, Connecticut. He served as Treasurer of the New York Life Insurance Company.

Barker died on January 27, 1848, in Buffalo, New York. He was buried at Yantic Cemetery in Norwich, Connecticut. After his death, his widow returned to Norwich and lived with her relatives.

Legal offices
Preceded by Willis Hall	New York State Attorney General; 1842–1845	Succeeded by John Van Buren
