= James I. Van Alen =

American politician (1772–1822)

Member of the U.S. House of Representatives from New York's 8th district
- In office March 4, 1807 – March 3, 1809
- Preceded by: Henry W. Livingston
- Succeeded by: John Thompson

Member of the New York State Assembly from Columbia County
- In office July 1, 1803 – June 30, 1804 Serving with Benjamin Birdsall, Stephen Miller, Samuel Ten Broeck
- Preceded by: Samuel Edmonds, Aaron Kellogg, Moncrief Livingston, Peter Silvester
- Succeeded by: Moncrief Livingston, Peter Silvester, William W. Van Ness, Jason Warner

Surrogate Judge of Columbia County, New York
- In office 1815–1822
- Preceded by: James Vanderpoel
- Succeeded by: Abraham A. Van Buren
- In office 1804–1808
- Preceded by: William W. Van Ness
- Succeeded by: Martin Van Buren

Town Clerk of Kinderhook, New York
- In office 1797–1801
- Preceded by: Abraham Van Buren
- Succeeded by: Elihu Gridley

Personal details
- Born: James Isaac Van Alen; December 31, 1772 Kinderhook, Province of New York, British America
- Died: May 18, 1822 (aged 49) Kinderhook, New York, U.S.
- Resting place: Kinderhook Cemetery, Kinderhook, New York
- Party: Democratic-Republican
- Parent(s): Johannes Van Alen; Maria Hoes
- Relatives: Martin Van Buren (half-brother)
- Profession: Attorney

James Isaac Van Alen (December 31, 1772 – May 18, 1822) was an American politician from Kinderhook, New York. A Democratic-Republican, he served as a United States representative, a member of the New York State Assembly, and Surrogate Judge of Columbia County, New York. Van Alen was law partners with U.S. President Martin Van Buren, his younger half-brother.

== Early life ==
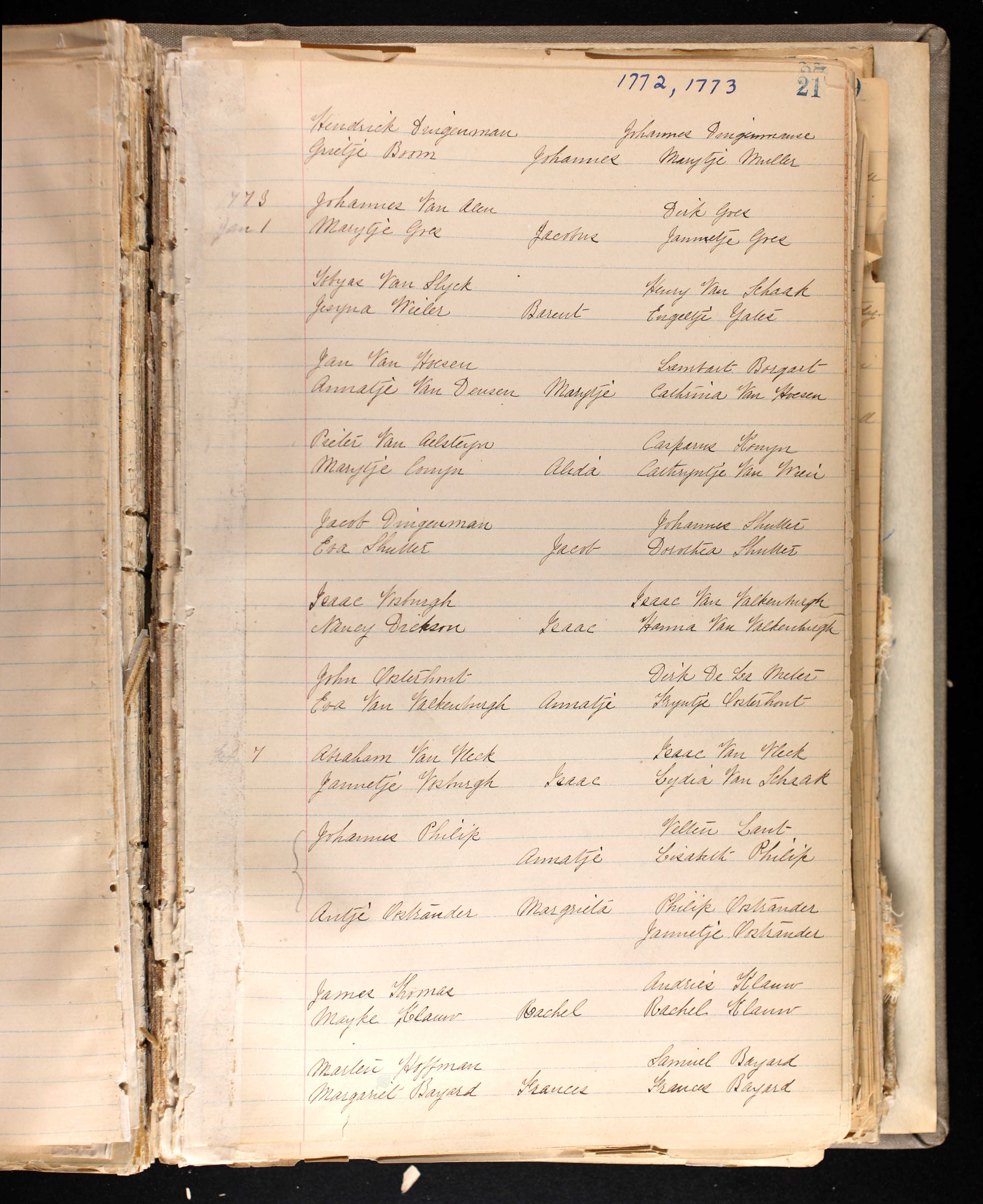
Baptism record, James I. Van Alen. "James" is the Anglicized version of the Dutch "Jacobus."

Van Alen was born in Kinderhook, New York, on December 31, 1772, to Johannes Van Alen (1744–1773) and Marytje Goes (or Hoes) Van Alen (1748–1817). On January 1, 1773, he was christened Jacobus Van Alen at Kinderhook's Dutch Reformed Church. He had two siblings, Marytje (or Maria) Van Alen and John Isaac Van Alen. After the death of his father, his mother married Abraham Van Buren in 1776. His mother had five more children with Van Buren including Dirckie "Derike" Van Buren, Jannetje (called "Hannah" or "Jane") Van Buren, future U.S. President Martin Van Buren, Lawrence Van Buren, and Abraham Van Buren Jr.

Van Alen attended the common schools, studied law, and was admitted to the bar in 1794.

== Career ==
After being admitted to the bar in New York, he practiced in Kinderhook, later practicing in partnership with Martin Van Buren. From 1797 to 1801, he was Kinderhook's Town Clerk. Van Alen was also involved in various businesses, including serving as secretary of the board of directors for the Chatham Turnpike Corporation.

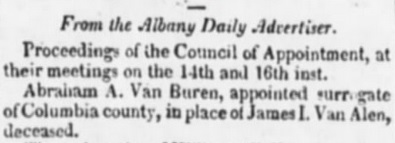
New York Evening Post note on Van Alen's successor as surrogate. September 19, 1822.

He was a member of the State constitutional convention of 1801, and was a justice of the peace from 1801 to 1804. He was a member of the New York State Assembly in 1804. Van Alen was surrogate judge of Columbia County from 1804 to 1808.

=== U.S. Congress ===
Van Alen was elected to the 10th Congress as a Democratic-Republican, succeeding Henry W. Livingston and holding office from March 4, 1807, to March 3, 1809. He was an unsuccessful candidate for reelection in 1808 and John Thompson replaced him in the House.

=== Later career ===
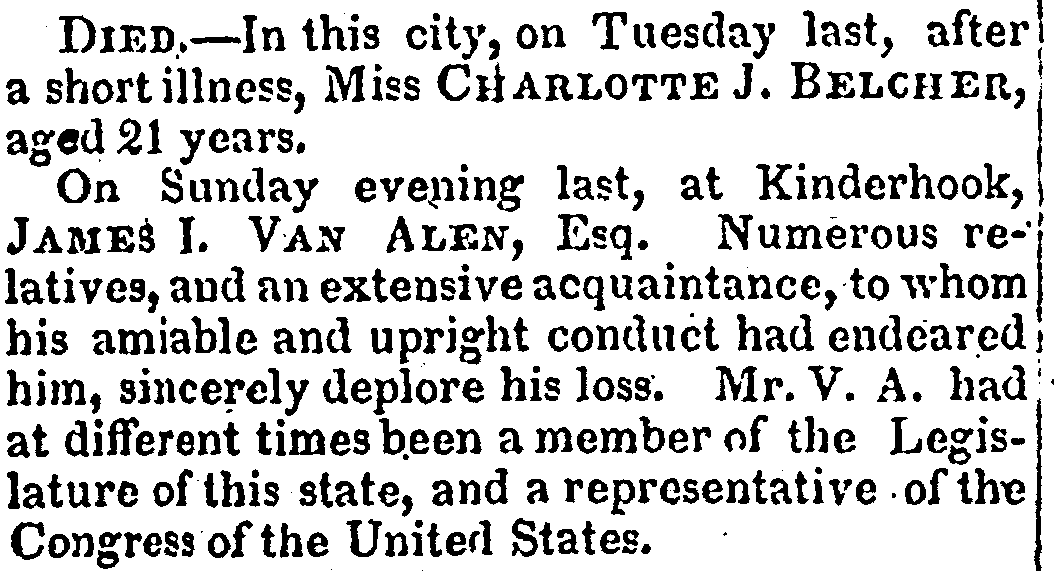
Death Notice, James I. Van Alen. Albany Argus (Albany, NY), May 21, 1822.

He later returned to the surrogate judge's position, serving from 1815 until his death. He was succeeded by his half-brother, Abraham A. Van Buren.

== Personal life ==
Van Alen never married or had children. He died in Kinderhook on May 18, 1822, aged 49, and was buried at Kinderhook Cemetery.

U.S. House of Representatives
Preceded by Henry W. Livingston	Member of the U.S. House of Representatives from New York's 8th congressional district 1807–1809	Succeeded by John Thompson
