= John Van Buren =

American lawyer and politician

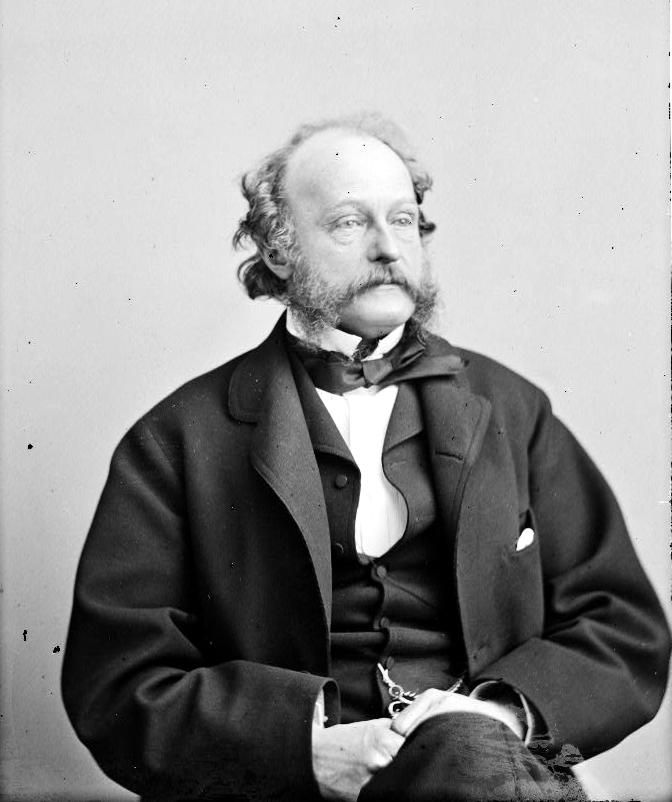
- John Van Buren, c. 1855–1865

21st Attorney General of New York
- In office February 3, 1845 – December 31, 1847
- Governor: Silas Wright; John Young
- Preceded by: George P. Barker
- Succeeded by: Ambrose L. Jordan

Personal details
- Born: February 18, 1810 Hudson, New York, U.S.
- Died: October 13, 1866 (aged 56) Near Cape Race, Newfoundland
- Resting place: Albany Rural Cemetery, Menands, New York
- Party: Democratic Party
- Other political affiliations: Free Soil Party
- Spouse: Elizabeth Vanderpoel (m. 1841; died 1844)
- Children: Anna Van Buren
- Parent(s): Martin Van Buren; Hannah Hoes
- Relatives: Abraham Van Buren (grandfather); Abraham Van Buren II (brother)
- Education: Yale College (1828)
- Profession: Lawyer

John Van Buren (February 18, 1810 – October 13, 1866) was an American lawyer and politician. In addition to serving as a key advisor to his father, President Martin Van Buren, he was also attorney general of New York from 1845 to 1847.

The son of Hannah (née Hoes) and Martin Van Buren, John Van Buren graduated from Yale University, studied law, and attained admission to the bar in 1830. He served as secretary of the U.S. legation when Martin Van Buren was U.S. minister to Britain in 1831 and 1832, after which he practiced law in Albany, New York. He returned to England from 1838 to 1839, and attended the Coronation of Queen Victoria. Van Buren served as New York's attorney general from 1845 to 1847, and was the chief prosecutor of the leaders of the Anti-Rent War.

Van Buren later practiced law in New York City, where he developed a reputation as an effective trial attorney, with his memory for details and oratorical skills making him a formidable courtroom advocate. In 1848, Van Buren led the Barnburners—New York Democrats opposed to the election of Lewis Cass as president on the grounds that he was too friendly to the slaveholding South. Van Buren persuaded his father to run as the candidate of the Barnburners and the Free Soil Party in order to defeat Cass; Martin Van Buren won enough votes in New York to enable Zachary Taylor to defeat Cass and win the presidency.

In Van Buren's later years he traveled extensively; he died aboard ship while en route from England to New York, and was buried at Albany Rural Cemetery.

== Early life ==
He was born on February 18, 1810, in Hudson, Columbia County, New York, the second son of President Martin Van Buren and Hannah Hoes Van Buren. (Some sources list his birth date as February 10.) He graduated from Yale College in 1828, studied law with Benjamin F. Butler and Aaron Vanderpoel, and attained admission to the bar in 1830. In 1831, when Martin Van Buren was appointed U.S. Minister to Britain, John Van Buren accompanied him as secretary of the American Legation in London. Both returned in 1832 after Congress failed to confirm the appointment.

John Van Buren then opened a law practice with James McKown in Albany. Contemporaries said he had a remarkable memory and that "his success at the bar was great, but his fame as a lawyer has been dimmed by his wit and his wonderful ability as a politician." He returned to England on his own from 1838 to 1839. He had seats at Queen Victoria's coronation, attended the Queen's prorogue of Parliament, and earned the nickname "Prince John" from newspaper reporters after he danced with her at an 1838 ball.

On June 22, 1841, he married Elizabeth Vanderpoel (b. May 22, 1810), his childhood sweetheart and the niece of Aaron Vanderpoel. They had one daughter, Anna (1842–1923). Elizabeth Vanderpoel died on November 19, 1844, and Van Buren never remarried.

== Attorney General of New York ==
From 1845 to 1847, he served as New York State attorney general, the last holder of that office elected by joint ballot of the Assembly and Senate, under the provisions of the state Constitution of 1821. In 1845, he conducted the prosecution of some leaders of the Anti-Rent War for riot, conspiracy, and robbery. The anti-renters were engaged in a long-running dispute with the heirs of Stephen Van Rensselaer, the patroon who owned their land. The tenants had lifetime leases; if they sold them, they were obligated to pay Van Rensselaer a year's rent or a quarter of the sale price. In addition, the Panic of 1837 left many in arrears on their rent. After Van Rensselaer's 1839 death, tenants withheld rent and "quarter-sale" payments in an effort to obtain favorable repayment terms. In addition, they organized to prevent sheriff's auctions of anti-renters' goods to pay the debts. Ambrose L. Jordan led the defense. At the first trial the jury was deadlocked. At the re-trial, in September 1845, Jordan insulted Van Buren; Van Buren responded by punching the fifty-six-year-old defense counsel. Jordan's swing at Van Buren also connected, while defendant Smith A. Boughton ducked to avoid the attorney's blows.

Presiding judge John W. Edmonds sentenced both attorneys to solitary confinement in the county jail for twenty-four hours: Governor Silas Wright refused to accept Van Buren's resignation, and both counsel continued after their release from jail. Boughton was convicted and sentenced to life imprisonment. At the next state election Governor Wright was defeated by John Young, who had the support of the Anti-Renters, and Young pardoned Boughton.

In December 1845, Wright directed Van Buren to work on an act to limit the tenure of the manor lords. The bill was the most radical reform considered by the New York State Legislature during the Anti-Rent years. After its passage, the death of a manor landlord extinguished a renter's lease. As a result, the landlords subdivided their large manor holdings for sale to individual farmers and homeowners or commercially developed them.

John Van Buren also prosecuted the case of William Freeman, who murdered four members of the Van Nest family of Cayuga County, New York on March 12, 1846. The defense, led by William H. Seward, tried to prove that Freeman was insane and therefore could not stand trial, but a jury empaneled to consider the question disagreed, siding with Van Buren. Another jury was then empaneled and the murder trial began. Freeman was found guilty on July 23, 1846, and the next day the judge sentenced him to hang on September 18. The execution was stayed, and in January 1847, an appeals court granted Freeman a new trial. Freeman died in his jail cell of tuberculosis on August 21, 1847, weeks before the retrial was to begin.

After the Freeman trial, Van Buren moved to New York City and formed a partnership with Hamilton W. Robinson. He acted as counsel for actor Edwin Forrest during Forrest's highly publicized divorce case, bringing Van Buren to public attention again.

== Free Soil Party leader ==
Van Buren was an effective campaign speaker, especially with urban working class audiences. In his speeches Van Buren frequently argued against slavery, calling it a degrading influence on free labor.

In 1848, Van Buren was the leader of the Barnburner faction of the Democratic Party, which repudiated the 1848 Democratic National Convention's selection of Lewis Cass, who was perceived as too friendly to slaveholders' rights. The Barnburners met for a State Convention in Utica, New York on June 22 and nominated Martin Van Buren as their presidential candidate. On August 9, the National Convention of the Free Soil Party, held in Buffalo, New York, endorsed this nomination. Martin Van Buren had no expectation of winning, but his increasingly anti-slavery views caused him to oppose Cass, and he also hoped to exact a measure of revenge, since Cass was instrumental in denying Martin Van Buren the Democratic nomination in 1844. Martin Van Buren failed to win a single state, but won enough votes in New York to tip the state to Zachary Taylor, who won the White House as a result.

Many Free Soil members joined the Republican Party when it was formed in the mid-1850s, and in 1860 former Free Soiler Hannibal Hamlin was the successful Republican candidate for vice president. Though most former Free Soil members became Republicans because of the slavery issue, many including Martin and John Van Buren chose to return to the Democratic fold.

== Death and burial ==
In 1865, John Van Buren again ran for New York state Attorney General on the Democratic ticket, and was defeated by Republican John H. Martindale. After Van Buren's election defeat, he visited Europe accompanied by his daughter and niece. "They traveled extensively in England, Sweden, Norway and Russia." On October 13, 1866, Van Buren died from kidney disease while at sea near Cape Race, Newfoundland as he traveled from Liverpool to New York City aboard the steamship Scotia. A storm set in after his death, and believing it was an omen, the Scotia's sailors tried to cast his body into the sea, but the captain would not allow it.

After the ship arrived in Manhattan, funeral services were held at Grace Church, where pallbearers included Samuel J. Tilden, Gouverneur Kemble, Alonzo C. Paige, Edwin W. Stoughton, Samuel L. M. Barlow, and James T. Brady, and mourners included Peter Cooper and Gulian C. Verplanck. A second service took place at St. Peter's Church in Albany. Van Buren was buried at Albany Rural Cemetery, Section 62, Box 28.

== The other John Van Buren ==
John Van Buren, the son of Martin Van Buren, is sometimes confused with judge and congressman John Van Buren of Kingston, Ulster County, New York. President Van Buren's son was born in 1810 and died in 1866. John Van Buren of Kingston was born in 1799 and died in 1855. While both John Van Burens were active in New York's Democratic Party, President Van Buren's son never lived in Kingston, served as a judge, or was elected to Congress.

== Rumors ==
Van Buren was a man surrounded by innuendoes, even after his death. According to a legend still repeated in upstate New York, Van Buren lost $5,000, and with it, his father's home Lindenwald, as well as a mistress, the very popular Elena "America" Vespucci, descendant of Amerigo Vespucci, to George Parish of Ogdensburg, New York in a card game at the LeRay Hotel in Evans Mills, New York. This story is almost certainly untrue, but it has remained associated with Van Buren.

Van Buren has also been credited (possibly apocryphally) with a semi-humorous expression related to ballot stuffing, "Vote early and vote often".

== See also ==
- Family of Martin Van Buren
- John Van Buren (congressman)

== Sources ==
- USgennet.org, NY history
- "Index to Politicians: Valentino to Vancampen". The Political Graveyard.
- PGVhosting.com, Van Buren Genealogy
- "Van Buren's Lindenwold" (PDF). The New York Times. July 30, 1898. includes an account of the altercation at the trial.
- Arpey, Andrew W. (2003). The William Freeman Murder Trial: Insanity, Politics and Race. Syracuse, New York: Syracuse University Press.
- Ellis, Franklin (1878). History of Columbia County, New York. Philadelphia: Everts & Ensign. pp. 56–73.
- "Obituary: Death of John Van Buren" (PDF). The New York Times. October 17, 1866.

Legal offices
Preceded by George P. Barker	New York State Attorney General; 1845–1847	Succeeded by Ambrose L. Jordan
