= Vote early and vote often =

American tongue-in-cheek political phrase

Vote early and vote often is a generally tongue-in-cheek phrase used in relation to elections and the voting process. Though rarely considered a serious suggestion, the phrase theoretically encourages corrupt electoral activity, but is used mostly to suggest the occurrence of such corruption.

The phrase had its origins in the United States in the 1850s, and had an early appearance in 1859 Great Britain when a newspaper reprinted correspondence from an American solicitor. The phrase, however, did not find widespread use until the early 20th century, when it was used in relation to the activities of organized crime figures in Chicago.

== Meaning ==
=== Vote early ===
This portion of the phrase suggests a person should arrive to vote early in the day. Most democratic electoral processes involve polling booths, which are open for a mandated period of time. Voting early would suggest a particular enthusiasm for voting not necessarily shared by other electors.

At the time the phrase was coined, this portion of the phrase is generally accepted to be a reference to voting early on polling day or early in the electoral process and not a reference to the formal process of early voting (which at the time of the phrase's coining did not exist). Before the introduction of the secret ballot in the latter half of the 19th century, open voting was the prevalent voting process. Under this system, returning officers frequently tallied votes as they were cast. Typically, it was neither illegal nor frowned on to report these results while the vote was in progress, and in any event few returning officers had either the ability or the inclination to suppress such reports. In such an environment, a candidate could provide a significant disincentive to vote against him by recording a seemingly insurmountable lead as early in the poll as possible, since at least some supporters of his opponents would presumably have not wanted to attract the ire of a powerful politician in support of a lost cause.

During and even after the Nazi seizure of power in Germany, secret voting was technically possible, however, the Nazis subverted the process by packing the polling stations prior to opening with their own fanatical supporters. At the time, it was not illegal in Germany for a voter to decline their right to the use of the voting booths provided, so the Nazis would intimidate non-Nazi electorate by voting openly while expressing contempt for secret voting. This, combined with other techniques, was first practiced on a limited basis in the partly-free election of March 1933 and then on a universal basis in all of the sham elections and referendums the Nazis held thereafter. The tactics proved effective in dissuading most ordinary Germans from opposing Adolf Hitler's regime via the electoral process. Following World War II, as part of the denazification process, the reformed government in West Germany quickly passed laws making it illegal for an elector to vote openly without using a voting booth. In East Germany the elections for the Volkskammer had ballots with only one name, and these were deposited in public view; the possibility existed to cross out the name, but no privacy was afforded and serious consequences could result.

Even today, it is often believed that early reports of the success of one party will motivate more of their supporters to come out or dissuade their opponents, although they could also convince less motivated supporters of a leading candidate that their votes are not required. In any event, to prevent just such an occurrence (whether real or perceived) most liberal democracies enforce restrictions while the polls are still open not only on the reporting of results, but also on exit polls and other data that might be construed as an indication of an ongoing election's eventual result.

=== Vote often ===
The "Vote often" portion of this phrase is the more controversial clause of this quote. While the phrase could be interpreted to mean that a citizen should vote in every election they are eligible to (such as party primaries, non-presidential election years and in local elections) so as to show a truly noble interest in one's civic duty, it appears that the phrase originally was meant to encourage citizens to vote as many times as they could even in the same election. While this practice was once legal in certain countries under certain limited circumstances (for example, some British voters were formerly allowed to vote both in their own geographical constituency and a special university constituency), it is now strictly prohibited in all liberal democracies. (Note: In the UK, people who live in two local authority areas may vote in local elections in both places, but this is prohibited for national elections.)

Most modern democratic electoral processes are operated on a one person, one vote basis (or at least, such as in the case where an electorate is to return multiple candidates to office, an equal number of votes per elector). As such, voting often (on one day) would suggest that the person is illegally voting as more than one person – a person with multiple voter registrations. The extra registrations might be for deceased persons, incapacitated living persons, persons known to have left the jurisdiction, fictional entities, and/or persons known to abstain from voting themselves, or persons registered (illegally) and voting in multiple locations.

As such, the phrase suggests the person in question is involved in ballot stuffing or some other form of electoral fraud involving an individual casting multiple votes.

Combined with the first part of the phrase, to vote early (either through the original meaning of early in the morning or through the formal process of early voting) gives the fraudulent voter the ability to cast multiple votes in a short period of time (if casting multiple in early votes), or time to travel to other precincts in order to cast ballots there, with only a minimal risk of getting caught.

== History ==
Historian James Morgan, in a 1926 publication, identified John Van Buren as the originator of the phrase, an identification supported by Laurence Urdang and Janet Braunstein. Bartlett's Familiar Quotations notes its usage in 1858, by William Porcher Miles. The phrase gained popularity in the United States during the 1850s, being used by pro-slavery voters in Kansas, who were trying to sway an 1854 election in favor of allowing slavery in Kansas. By 1858 the phrase had become common, being cited in the Chicago Press and the New York Times.

The British newspaper The Times of 27 August 1859 printed a letter about the use of the ballot for voting in the United States, written by Richard Henry Dana Jr. to his friend Lord Radstock. In the letter, Dana reports:

Our experience has shown us that in the excitement of great popular elections, deciding the policy of the country, and its vast patronage, frauds will be committed, if a chance is given for them. If these frauds are allowed, the result is not only that the popular will may be defeated, and the result falsified, but that the worst side will prevail. The side which has the greater number of dishonest men will poll the most votes. The war cry, "Vote early and vote often!" and the familiar problem, "how to cast the greatest number of votes with the smallest number of voters", indicate the direction in which the dangers lie.

The phrase is also noted as the "much vaunted maxim" of the Tammany Hall political machine of the 1860s: they used "repeaters", who were given five dollars and free liquor to go and vote for recently deceased voters. This process was depicted in the Martin Scorsese film Gangs of New York (2002), where drunkards are forcibly shaved (to alter their appearance) and turned back toward polling stations to vote again.

In 1933 in Dáil Éireann (the Irish lower house), Thomas Kelly of Fianna Fáil said,

If a poor man is sick in hospital and not able to get out, surely it is a good turn to see that his vote is registered. If he has gone away and his neighbours know his opinions, I do not see any harm in personation. ... vote early and often.

In his book Capone, John Kobler attributes the phrase to the gangster Al Capone. In the United States, Republicans accused their opponents of inviting such corruption with their support of the National Voter Registration Act of 1993, the "Motor Voter Law".

== See also ==
- Release early, release often
