= Abraham Van Buren =

Businessman, father of Martin van Buren

Town Clerk of Kinderhook, New York
- In office 1787–1796
- Preceded by: None (position created)
- Succeeded by: James I. Van Alen

Personal details
- Born: February 17, 1737 Albany, New York
- Died: April 8, 1817 (aged 80) Kinderhook Village, New York
- Resting place: Reformed Church Cemetery, Kinderhook, New York
- Party: Democratic-Republican (after 1792)
- Other political affiliations: Anti-Federalist (1787–1789); Jeffersonian (1789–1792)
- Spouse: Maria Hoes (or Goes) Van Alen (m. 1776)
- Children: 5 (including Martin Van Buren)

Military service
- Branch/service: New York Militia
- Years of service: 1775–1783
- Rank: Captain
- Unit: 7th Regiment, Albany County Militia
- Battles/wars: American Revolutionary War

Abraham Van Buren (February 17, 1737 – April 8, 1817) was an American businessman and local public official from Kinderhook, New York. A Patriot and militia veteran of the American Revolutionary War, he was the father of Martin Van Buren, the eighth president of the United States.

== Biography ==
Abraham Van Buren was born in Albany, New York on February 17, 1737, the son of Marten Pieterse Van Buren (1701–1766) and Dirckje (Van Alstyne) Van Buren (1710–1798). The fifth of nine children, he was a descendant of Cornelis Maessen, a native of Buurmalsen, Netherlands who had come to North America in 1631.

Van Buren owned a Kinderhook farm and several slaves, as well as a combined tavern and inn. (Note: According to the 1800 U.S. Census, Abraham Van Buren owned three slaves. His son Lawrence inherited Abraham's farm and other property, and according to the 1830 census owned no slaves. This was in keeping with New York's 1799 and 1817 gradual emancipation laws, which ended slavery in the state by 1827.) Most of Kinderhook's residents were descendants of the Dutch colonists who created New Netherland, and they spoke Dutch as their primary language. The Van Buren tavern was strategically situated on the main route between New York City and Albany. In addition to being a prominent destination for stagecoach travelers, Van Buren's tavern was also a prominent local meeting place, and used for political gatherings, town meetings, and as a polling place.

During the American Revolution, Van Buren identified with the Patriot cause and served in the Albany County Militia's 7th Regiment with the rank of captain. After the war, Van Buren was active in politics as an Anti-Federalist and Jeffersonian, and he joined the Democratic-Republican Party at its founding. In 1787, Van Buren was elected to serve as Kinderhook's town clerk, the first individual chosen for this position after it was created. He served until 1797 and was succeeded by his stepson James I. Van Alen. The details of Abraham Van Buren's education are not known, but according to 1914's A History of Old Kinderhook, his excellent penmanship and the legibility of the town records he produced was still notable more than 120 years after he created them.

== Family ==
In 1776, Abraham Van Buren married Maria Hoes (or Goes) Van Alen (1747–1818), the widow of Johannes Van Alen. From his wife's first marriage to Johannes Van Alen, Van Buren was the stepfather of:

- Marytje (or Maria) Van Alen (1768–1829), who married John L. Hoes.
- John I. Van Alen (1770–1805)
- James I. Van Alen (1772–1822), who practiced law with Martin Van Buren, succeeded Abraham Van Buren as town clerk and also served as a member of Congress (1807–1809).

From his own marriage, Van Buren's children included:

- Dirckie "Derike" Van Buren (1777–1865), who married Barent Hoes (1777–1853). Barent Hoes was the brother of Martin Van Buren's wife, and served in local offices including town clerk.
- Jannetje (Called "Hannah" or "Jane") Van Buren (1780–1838), who never married and who resided with her sister Dirckie Van Buren and brother-in-law Barent Hoes.
- Martin Van Buren (1782–1862), 8th president of the United States.
- Lawrence (or Laurence) Van Buren (1786–1868), a store owner and attorney who served as a militia officer in the War of 1812 and held local offices including Kinderhook Town Supervisor, postmaster, and presidential elector in 1852.
- Abraham Van Buren (1788–1836), an attorney who served as Columbia County Surrogate after Martin Van Buren and James I. Van Alen.

== Death and burial ==
Van Buren died in Kinderhook on April 8, 1817. He was buried at Kinderhook Reformed Church Cemetery.

== Reputation ==
Martin Van Buren apparently said and wrote very little about his father. In one of his few recorded recollections, Martin Van Buren wrote of his father that Abraham Van Buren was an amiable man who had no enemies, but also had little talent for making or saving money. Abraham Van Buren's children erected a marker over his grave, which contained a detailed epitaph:

SACRED

to the memory of Capt. Abraham Van Buren, who died on the
eighth day of April, in the year of our Lord, 1817, in the eighty
first year of his age. He was tender and indulgent to his family,
benevolent and charitable to all around him; and moreover a
good man whose upright heart, mild temper and conciliatory
manners secured to him what he liked to reciprocate — the good
will and friendship of all. He died in full reliance upon the grace
of God through the mediatory sacrifice of Christ for his salvation.

Lands that beneath a burning sky
Have long been desolate and dry,
Th' effusions of his love shall share.

And sudden greens and herbage wear.
