= Michael Conniff =

Michael Lee Conniff (born 1942) was a historian of Latin America, who specialized on modern Brazil and Panama. Between 2002 and 2012 he also created and directed the Global Studies program and afterward served as professor of history at San Jose State University, California. He went to half-time teaching in 2012 and retired in 2016. He had longstanding interests in populism and Africans in Latin America.

In 1962 Conniff joined the Peace Corps and spent two years in Guayaquil, Ecuador, as a volunteer for urban community development. He continued working in community development as a contractor for the U.S. Agency for International Development in Panama (1966-1967).

Conniff earned his BA in Latin American Studies at the University of California, Berkeley, in 1968, followed by an MA in the same field at Stanford in 1969.

Conniff spent 1971–75 in Rio de Janeiro, Brazil, where he conducted research for his doctorate in Brazilian history at Stanford. He also worked as a consultant for social science and urban programs at the Ford Foundation office there and taught classes at the Pontifical Catholic University.

In 1975 Conniff moved with his family to Albuquerque, New Mexico, where he began as lecturer in history (1975-1976) at the University of New Mexico and finished his doctorate in Latin American History at Stanford. Between 1976 and 1985 he rose through the ranks to full professor. Meanwhile, his dissertation was published as Urban Politics in Brazil: The Rise of Populism, 1925-1945 (1981). He also edited and contributed to Latin American Populism in Comparative Perspective (1982). Three years later he published Black Labor on a White Canal: Panama, 1904-1981 (1985). He then co-edited and co-authored, with Frank D. McCann, Modern Brazil: Elites and Masses in Comparative Perspective (1989, revised 1991).

In 1990 Conniff moved to Auburn University, where he spent the next seven years as professor and part-time administrator. During that time he published Panama and the United States: the Forced Alliance (1992, revised 2001 and 2012) and Africans in the Americas: A History of the Black Diaspora (with Thomas J. Davis, 1994, reprinted 2003).

In 1997 Conniff became founding director of the Center for Latin American and Caribbean Studies and professor of history at the University of South Florida, and also founder and co-director for the Center for Disaster Management and Humanitarian Assistance in Tampa (1998-2000). During this time he and Lawrence Clayton published A New History of Modern Latin America (1999, revised 2005 and 2017, with Susan Gauss), and edited and contributed to Populism in Latin America (1999, revised 2012). His Modern Panama, co-authored with Gene E. Bigler, was published by Cambridge University Press in 2019.

During his career Conniff won and administered nearly four million dollars in grants from agencies like the National Endowment for the Humanities, the Department of Education, the Office of Naval Research, and the Defense Language Institute. He had four sons and eight grandchildren.

After retiring Conniff wrote several novels of historical fiction set in Latin America. Michael Lee Conniff died on June 23, 2025, in San Jose, California.

== Selected publications ==
- Urban Politics in Brazil: The Rise of Populism, 1925-1945. Pittsburgh: University of Pittsburgh Press, 1981. online
  - Brazilian edition by Relume Dumará Editora.
- Latin American Populism in Comparative Perspective. Editor and contributor. University of New Mexico Press, 1982
- Black Labor on a White Canal: Panama, 1904-1981. Pittsburgh: University of Pittsburgh Press, 1985.
- Modern Brazil: Elites and Masses in Comparative Perspective. With Frank D. McCann, editors and contributors. University of Nebraska Press, 1989, 1991.
- Panama and the United States: the Forced Alliance, 1903-1981.University of Georgia Press, 1992, 2001, 2012. online
- Africans in the Americas: A History of the Black Diaspora. With Thomas J. Davis, editors and contributors. St. Marin's Press, 1994, Blackwell, 2003. online
- A New History of Modern Latin America. Co-author with Lawrence Clayton. Harcourt Brace, 1999, Wadsworth, 2005, and University of California, 2017, with Susan Gauss.
- Populism in Latin America. Editor and contributor. University of Alabama Press, Tuscaloosa, 1999, 2012.
- Panama and the United States : the end of the alliance (2012)

online

- Modern Panama: From Occupation to Crossroads of the Americas. With Gene E. Bigler. University of Cambridge Press, Cambridge, 2019.
- The Great Panama Railroad Caper. Kindle, 2020.
