= Henry R. Nau =

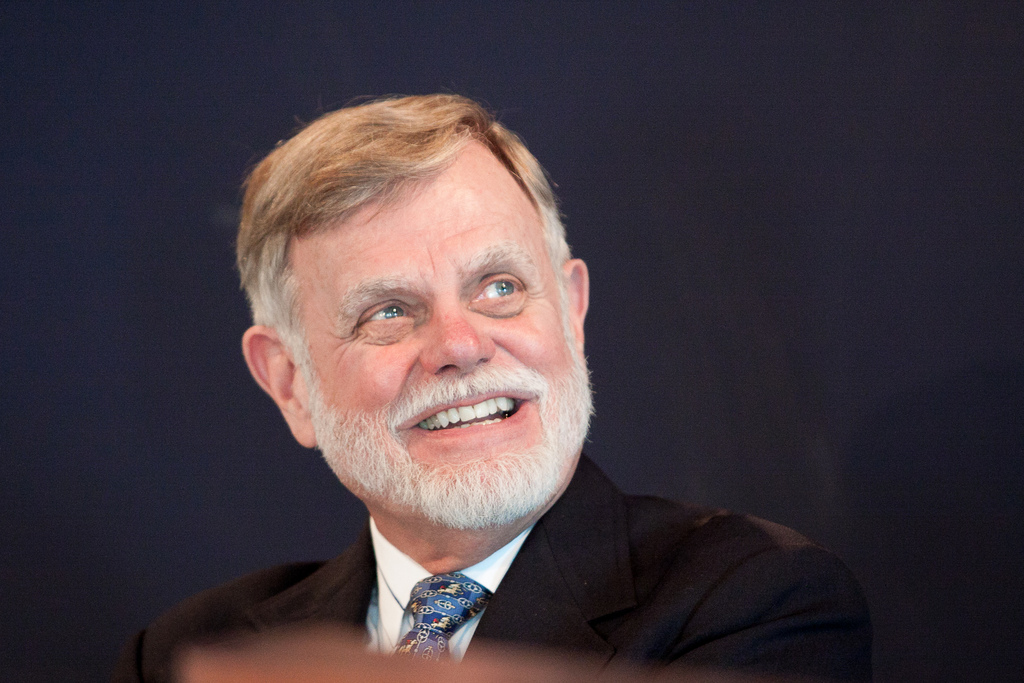
Henry R. Nau

Henry R. Nau is professor of political science and international affairs at Elliott School of International Affairs at George Washington University. He is the author of a theory of American foreign policy known as conservative internationalism and a book by the same name.

== Biography ==
Nau was born in 1941. He holds a B.S. degree in economics, politics and science from Massachusetts Institute of Technology, an M.A. from the School of Advanced International Studies (SAIS) at Johns Hopkins University. He received a Ph.D. from the same institution in 1972 with a thesis "Politics and peaceful technology in Western Europe: case study of nuclear reactor cooperation."

He was assistant professor at Williams College (1971–73) before coming to George Washington, and has also been visiting professor at Johns Hopkins SAIS, Stanford, and Columbia Universities. During his tenure at the George Washington University, Nau has established a reputation as one of the institution's leading conservative academics with respect to international relations.

== Political work ==
Since 1989 he has directed the longest standing Congressional parliamentary exchange program with foreign countries, semiannual meetings between Members of the US Congress, Japanese Diet, and Korean National Assembly.

From 1975 to 1977 he was special assistant to the undersecretary for economic affairs in the U.S. Department of State. From January 1981 to July 1983 in President Reagan's administration, he worked on international economic affairs as a senior staff member of the National Security Council. He was the White House's personal representative, or sherpa, for the G-7 Economic Summits at Ottawa (1981), Versailles (1982), and Williamsburg (1983) and a special summit with developing countries at Cancun, Mexico (1982).

== Books ==
- Conservative Internationalism: Armed Diplomacy Under Jefferson, Polk, Truman, and Reagan (Princeton University Press, 2013) ISBN 9780691159317
- (co-ed. with Deepa Mary Ollapally) Worldviews of Rising Powers: Domestic Foreign Policy Debates in China, India, Iran, Japan, and Russia (Oxford University Press, 2012), ISBN 9780199937479
- Perspectives on International Relations: Power, Institutions, and Ideas (CQ Press, 2011; 3rd Edition) ISBN 9781933116464
- At Home Abroad: Identity and Power in American Foreign Policy] (Cornell University Press, 2002), ISBN 9780801439315
  - translated into Japanese as アメリカの対外関与 : アイデンティティとパワー / Amerika no taigai kan'yo : Aidentiti to pawā, published by Yuhikaku Press, 2006
- Trade and Security: US Policies at Cross-Purposes] (American Enterprise Institute Press, 1995)
- The Myth of America's Decline: Leading the World Economy into the 1990s (Oxford University Press, 1990 ISBN 9780195060010; paperback with new preface, 1992), The book predicted the resurgence and preeminence of American economic and military power in the 1990s. David Warsh in The Washington Post, called it “a better guide than the others to the shape of things to come” and praised “its sharp judgments . . . [and] cool-headed prognostications of the future.”. According to WorldCat, the book is held in 994 libraries
  - translated into Japanese by Kazuo Ishizeki as アメリカ没落の神話 / Amerika botsuraku no shinwa published by TBS Britannica, 1994
  - translated into Chinese as 美国衰落的神话 : 领导世界经济进入九十年代 / Meiguo shuai luo de shen hua : ling dao shi jie jing ji jin ru jiu shi nian dai. Beijing Shi : Zhongguo jing ji chu ban she, 1994
- (ed.) Domestic Trade Politics and the Uruguay Round (Columbia University Press, 1989) ISBN 9780231068239
- (ed.) Technology transfer and U.S. foreign policy Praeger, 1976 ISBN 9780275567903
- National Politics and International Technology: Nuclear Reactor Development in Western Europe (Johns Hopkins University Press, 1974) ISBN 9780801815065
