= Martin Van Buren National Historic Site =

Historic site in New York, USA

- Lindenwald; Martin Van Buren National Historic Site
- U.S. National Register of Historic Places
- U.S. National Historic Landmark
- U.S. National Historic Site
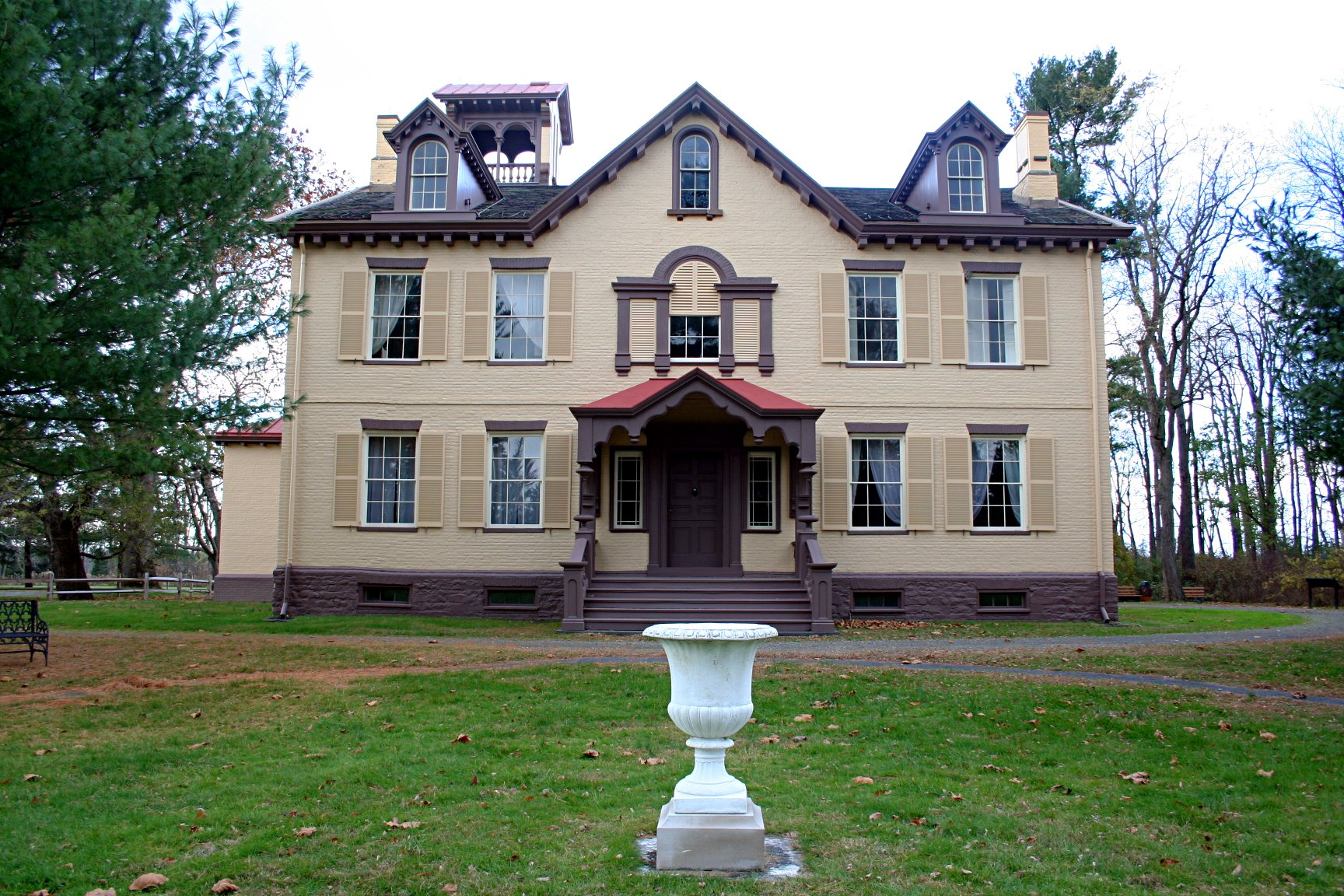
- Front of the house facing the Albany Post Road
- Interactive map showing Lindenwald’s location
- Location: Town of Kinderhook, Columbia County, New York
- Nearest city: Hudson, New York
- Coordinates: 42°22′10.94″N 73°42′15.14″W
- Area: 137 acres (55 ha)
- Built: 1797
- Architect: Peter Van Ness, Richard Upjohn
- Architectural style: Federal; Gothic Revival
- Visitation: 15,807 (2025)
- Website: Martin Van Buren National Historic Site
- NRHP reference No.: 66000510 (original); 12000406 (increase)

Significant dates
- Added to NRHP: October 15, 1966
- Boundary increase: July 11, 2012
- Designated NHL: July 4, 1961
- Designated NHS: October 26, 1974

Martin Van Buren National Historic Site is a unit of the United States National Park Service in Columbia County, New York, 1 mile (1.6 km) south of the village of Kinderhook, 125 miles (201 km) north of New York City and 20 miles (32 km) south of Albany. The National Historic Site preserves the Lindenwald estate owned by Martin Van Buren, the eighth president of the United States. Van Buren purchased the 36-room mansion during his presidency in 1839, and it became his home and farm from his leaving office in 1841 until his death in 1862.

== History ==
Van Buren, a founder of the Democratic Party, purchased the home and approximately 125 acres (51 ha) of land in 1839 for $14,000 (equal to $423,281 today) while he was still president. However, Van Buren did not move into the home until 1841 (after he was defeated for his second term by the Whig candidate William Henry Harrison in 1840). Eventually, his four living sons, Abraham, John, Martin Jr., and Smith, had rooms in the mansion. The home was previously owned by the Van Ness family and was where Washington Irving wrote most of his books A History of New York and Sketch Book. Irving and Van Buren later became friends.

Van Buren ran two United States presidential campaigns from Lindenwald. In 1844, he based his ultimately unsuccessful run for the Democratic nomination at the estate. That year, Van Buren lost a hotly contested fight to nominee and eventual President James Knox Polk. In 1848, in opposition to the extension of slavery into territories captured from Mexico as a result of the Mexican–American War, Van Buren ran for president on a third-party ticket (The Free Soil Party), again directing his campaign from Lindenwald. Van Buren's campaign drew enough votes away from the Democratic nominee, Lewis Cass, to allow Whig candidate Zachary Taylor to prevail.

Van Buren named the estate Lindenwald, which is German for "linden forest", after the American Linden (American Basswood or Tilia americana) trees lining the Albany-to-New York Post Road, which is still located in front of the home. The section of the road on the property remains unimproved to this day. Some replanted Linden trees also remain by the side of the road.

Van Buren died at Lindenwald on July 24, 1862. He was 79.

== Recognition ==
Lindenwald was declared a National Historic Landmark in 1961.

The Martin Van Buren National Historic Site was established on October 26, 1974, and today, Lindenwald is under the care of the National Park Service.

== Today ==
The site is located on New York State Route 9H, about 2 miles (3.2 km) south of Van Buren's hometown of Kinderhook, New York. It includes a visitor center operated by the National Park Service. Access to the Lindenwald mansion is by ranger-guided tour only. The tower cannot be visited due to fire safety codes. The grounds contain educational signs which tell of the history of the estate. During Van Buren's lifetime, the site also contained two gatehouses, a north one and a south one. The north gatehouse was demolished in the 1950s, but today the site is outlined with a stone foundation.

== Gallery ==
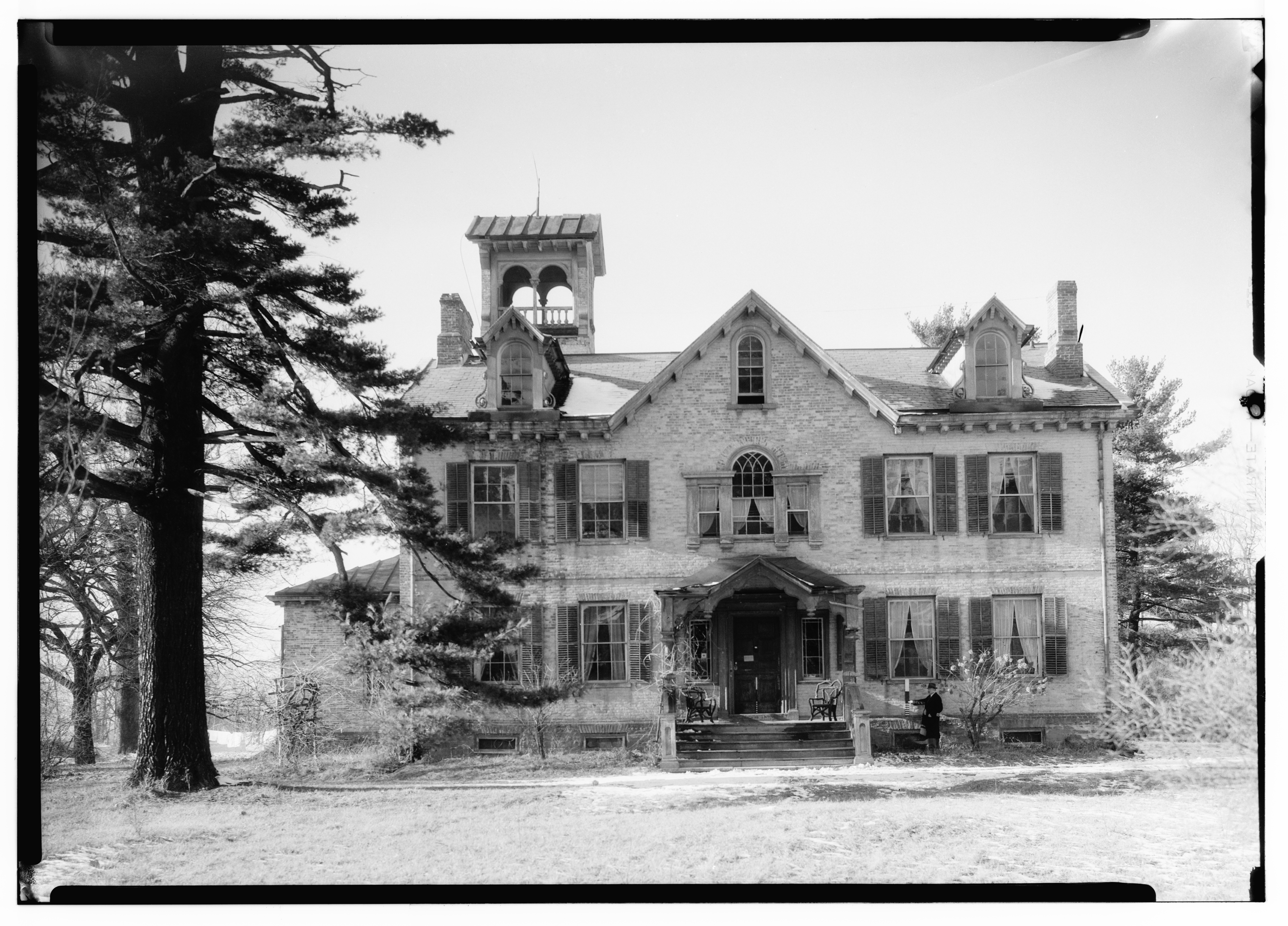
1937

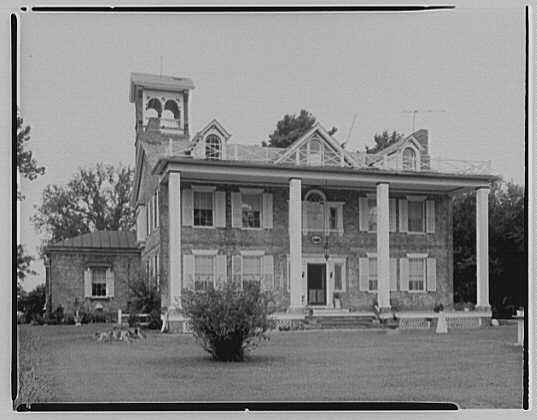
1961

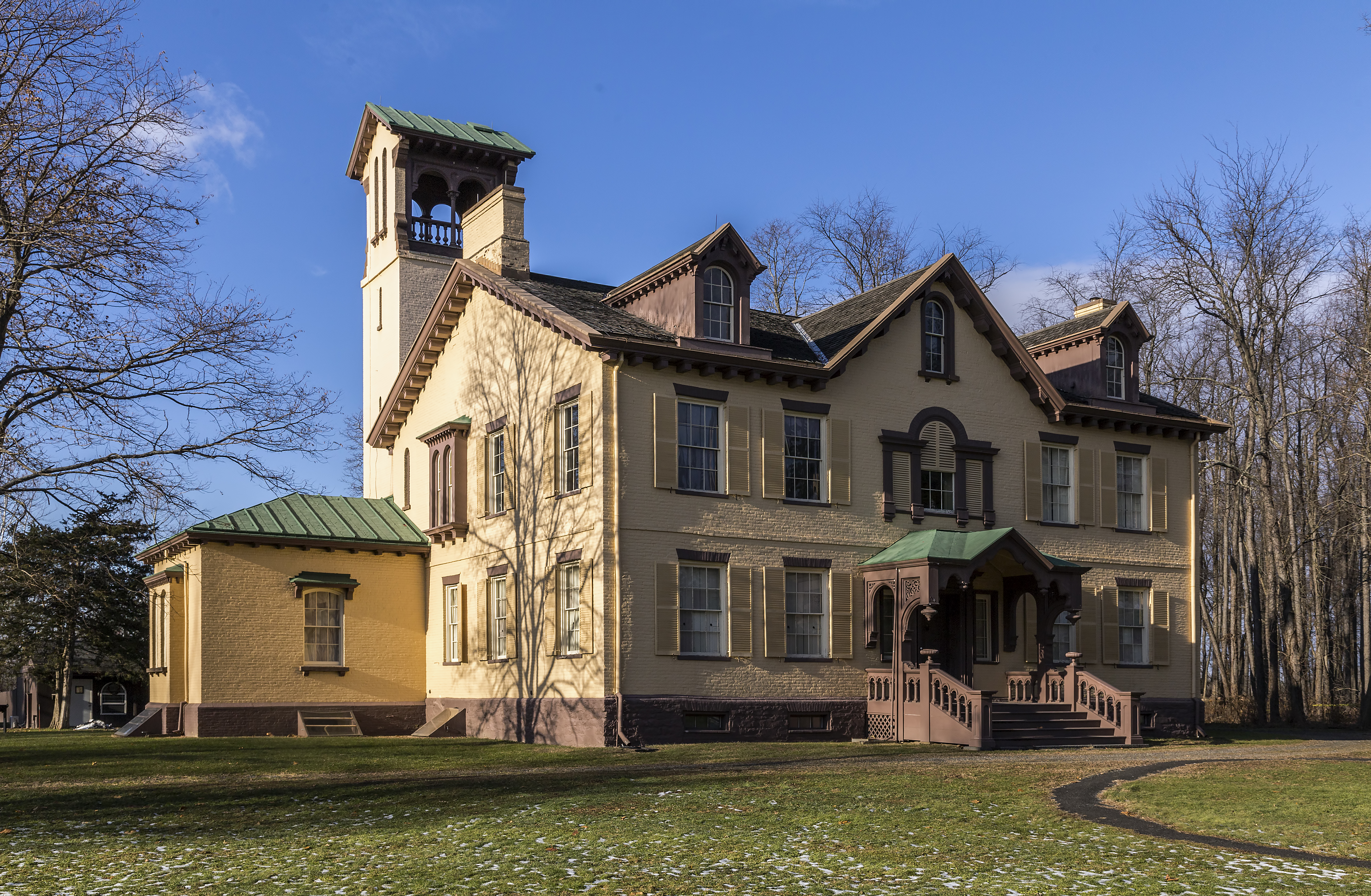
2017

== See also ==
- List of residences of presidents of the United States
- Presidential memorials in the United States
