= Van Alstyne's Regiment of Militia =

Van Alstyne's Regiment of Militia 7th Albany County Regiment
- Active: 1777
- Allegiance: State of New York
- Type: militia
- Part of: New York Militia
- Engagements: Battle of Bemis Heights?

Commanders
- Notable commanders: Abraham Van Alstyne

The Van Alstyne's Regiment of Militia, also known as the 7th Albany County Militia Regiment, was called up in July, 1777 at Kinderhook, New York to reinforce Gen. Horatio Gates's Continental Army during the Saratoga Campaign. The regiment served in Brigadier General Abraham Ten Broeck's Brigade. With the defeat of General John Burgoyne's British Army on October 17, 1777, the regiment stood down. It is uncertain whether the regiment participated in the October 7 Battle of Bemis Heights, and if it did, whether the entire regiment was there.

== Background ==
In June 1777 British General John Burgoyne began an attempt to divide the rebellious United States in the American Revolutionary War by moving south from the British province of Quebec to gain control of the Hudson River valley, separating the New England states from those to the south. After his early success at Ticonderoga, his campaign had become bogged down in difficulties. Elements of the army had reached the Hudson as early as the end of July, but logistical and supply difficulties delayed the main army at Fort Edward. He then moved south, crossing the Hudson near Saratoga and approaching the fortified position that General Horatio Gates had established south of the village.

== History ==
On June 25, when Burgoyne's army had arrived at Fort Crown Point, General Philip Schuyler wrote to New York's Governor, George Clinton, indicating that he would ask the militia's Brigadier General, Abraham Ten Broeck, to send some of his militia companies to assist in the defenses further north. On July 7, when Burgoyne occupied Fort Ticonderoga, Ten Broeck indicated that, on receipt of that news, he had sent some of his forces forward.

These forces probably did not include the 7th Albany County Regiment of Abraham van Alstyne, based in Kinderhook, New York. On September 18, one day before the Battle of Freeman's Farm, Governor Clinton wrote to the state's militia commander, General Abraham Ten Broeck, indicating he had ordered the remaining Albany County north to support Gates, issuing orders to Van Alstyne and other regimental leaders directly to speed their movement.

It is unclear whether Van Alstyne's regiment reached Saratoga before October 7. Historian Borden Mills notes that Ten Broeck's brigade was clearly not at full strength on the day of battle when his return for October 16, 1777 is compared to a later return listing his entire strength. (The October 16 return does not contain a detailed regimental breakdown.) Brendan Morrissey, in his order of battle, lists the regiment as a probable participant.

On October 9, in response to Clinton's request to Gates for militia to deal with the threat of British forces on the Hudson in the aftermath of the Battle of Forts Clinton and Montgomery, Gates' adjutant, James Wilkinson, wrote to Clinton that "The militia you demand were yesterday ordered down, and the Albany county [militia] will this day, the weather permitting, follow." This suggests that Van Alstyne's and other Albany County regiments were not present at Burgoyne's surrender, and were probably released after the British threat from New York City had subsided.

== See also ==
- Albany County militia
