= Joseph Rayback =

American historian

Joseph G. Rayback (1914–1983) was a professor of history in the United States.

== Career ==
He served in the United States Navy and earned a Ph.D. in American history at Case Western Reserve University in Cleveland, Ohio. For many years, he was a professor of history and chair of the department at Pennsylvania State University. He was faculty advisor to Phi Alpha Theta, the honorary in history and with Donald B. Hoffmann helped to organize the society on a national basis. He served on the editorial board of the journal, The Historian, published by Phi Alpha Theta. Following service at Penn State, Rayback taught American history at the University of Saskatchewan in western Canada. In 1966, he was appointed professor of history at Temple University. Among the courses he taught at the undergraduate level at Temple were American social and political history. At the graduate level he held seminars in Slavery and Antislavery and the Antebellum period.

Rayback studied the issues of American politics from 1830 to 1860 including federal politics of the slavery issue, and the rise of the Republican Party. He mentored dissertations in antebellum history, including the Antimasonic movement in New York State. As a corollary to this work, Rayback also became a scholar of early immigration policy in the U.S.

In 1959, Rayback wrote a history of the American labor movement.

Rayback was working on a biography of president Martin van Buren when he died in 1983. He had collected an immense amount of data on New York state elections in the period 1820–1860. The half-completed work was expanded and finished by Jerome Mushkat, a professor emeritus of history at the University of Akron. Another of Rayback's students was William H. Brackney, professor of Christian Thought and Ethics at Acadia University in Nova Scotia.

== Personal life ==
Rayback was married to Virginia Kay Rayback and was brother to Robert J. Rayback, formerly professor of history at Syracuse University and author of Millard Fillmore: Biography of a President. Rayback was an active lay leader in the Episcopal Church, University Park, Pennsylvania.

== Published works ==
- Mushkat, Jerome and Rayback, Joseph G. Martin Van Buren: Law, Politics, and the Shaping of Republican Ideology. DeKalb, Ill.: Northern Illinois University Press, 1997. ISBN 0-87580-229-X
- Rayback, Joseph. Free Soil: The Election of 1848. Lexington, Ky.: University Press of Kentucky, 1971. ISBN 0-8131-1222-2
- Rayback, Joseph G. A History of American Labor. Rev. and exp. ed. New York: MacMillan Publishing Co., 1974. ISBN 9780029258507
