= Joel H. Silbey =

American historian (1933–2018)

- Born: Joel Henry Silbey; August 16, 1933
- Died: August 7, 2018 (aged 84)
- Education: Brooklyn College; University of Iowa
- Occupation: Historian

Joel Henry Silbey (August 16, 1933 – August 7, 2018) was an American historian who spent his career at Cornell University and was the President White Professor of History Emeritus there. Silbey was known for his studies of the history of the United States in the 19th century and especially the Jacksonian era, the creation and evolution of U.S. political parties, the sectional crises of the 1840s and 1850s, and the American Civil War and Reconstruction era. He used the techniques of quantitative history and became known as one of "New Political Historians".

Joel H. Silbey was born on August 16, 1933, to parents Sidney R. and Estelle Silbey. He attended Brooklyn College in his hometown, graduating in 1955, before pursuing graduate study at the University of Iowa, earning his master's and doctoral degrees in 1956 and 1963, respectively. He taught at San Francisco State College, the University of Pittsburgh, and the University of Maryland before joining the Cornell University faculty in 1966. Two years later, Silbey became a full professor.

A recipient of the Clark Distinguished Faculty Award for undergraduate teaching, the courses Silbey taught included "The United States in the Middle Period, 1815–1850", "The Structure of American Political History", "The American Civil War and Reconstruction", and "Quantitative Approaches in History", as well as freshman, upper-class, and graduate seminars in various aspects of nineteenth-century American political history. Silbey also directed the Cornell-In-Washington program.

Silbey received a Guggenheim Fellowship. He was appointed President White Professor of History in 1986, serving until retirement in 2002. He was named the Harmsworth Professor of American History at the University of Oxford for the 2004–2005 academic year, and continued to write and publish scholary work throughout his retirement. Silbey died at the age of 84 on August 7, 2018.

== Selected publications ==
- The Shrine of Party: Congressional Voting Behavior, 1841–1852 (University of Pittsburgh Press, 1967)
- The Transformation of American Politics, 1840–1860 (Prentice-Hall, 1967, American Historical Sources Series) [editor and author of introductory essay]
- The Partisan Imperative: The Dynamics of American Politics before the Civil War (Oxford University Press, 1985)
- The Congress of the United States, 1789–1989 (Carlson Publications, 1991) [editor]
- The American Political Nation, 1838–1893 (Stanford University Press, 1991)
- Martin Van Buren and the Emergence of American Popular Politics (Rowman & Littlefield, 2002)
