= Hannah Van Buren =

Wife of Martin Van Buren

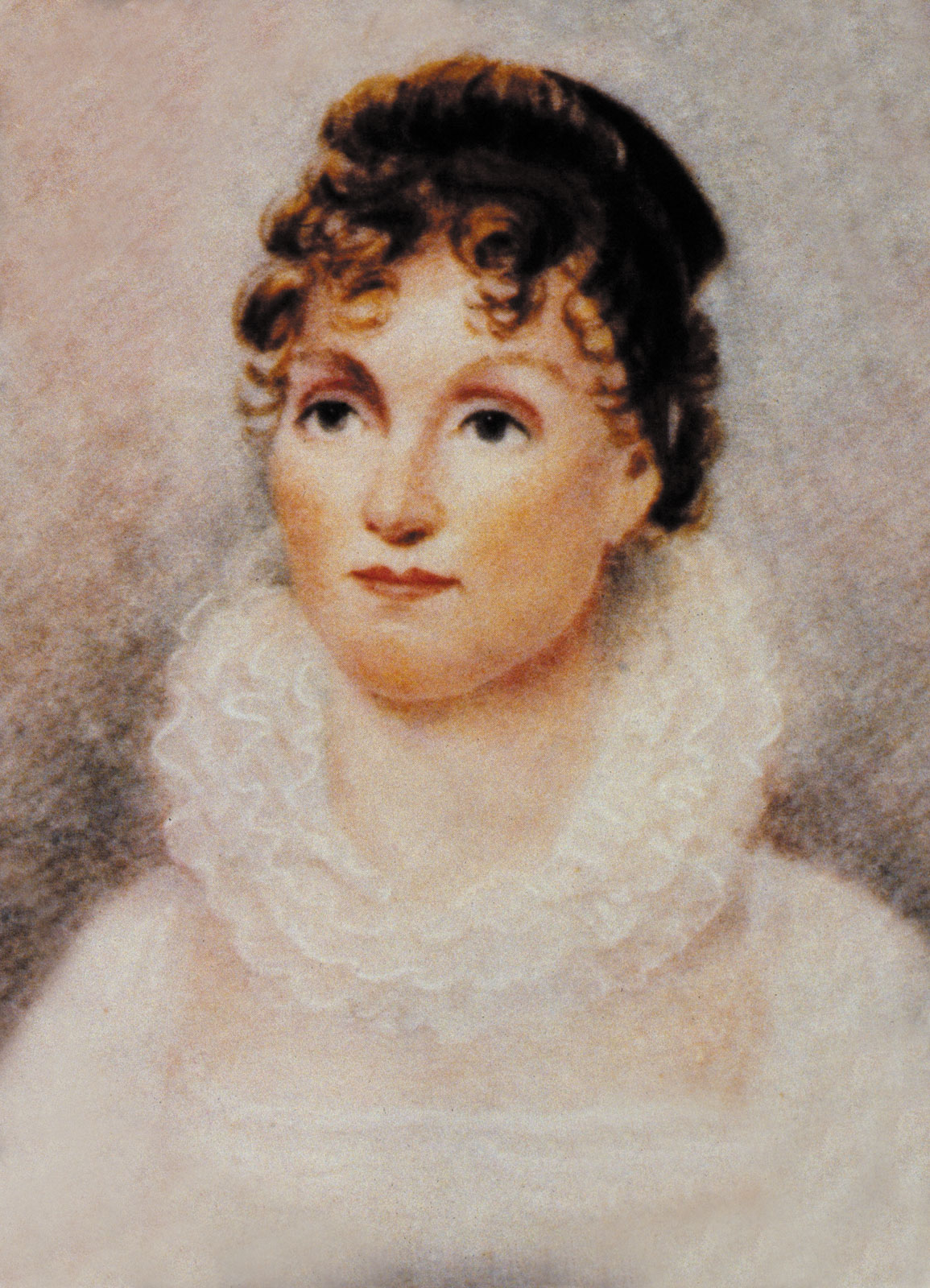

Personal details
- Born: Hannah Hoes; March 8, 1783 Kinderhook, New York, U.S.
- Died: February 5, 1819 (aged 35) Albany, New York, U.S.
- Spouse: Martin Van Buren (m. 1807)
- Children: 6, including Abraham and John

Hannah Van Buren (née Hoes; March 8, 1783 – February 5, 1819) was the wife of the eighth President of the United States, Martin Van Buren. Very little is known about her as she died from tuberculosis in 1819, before Martin Van Buren became president. He never remarried and was one of the few Presidents to ascend the office while widowed.

== Marriage and children ==
Hannah Hoes married her childhood friend and cousin Martin Van Buren in 1807 when she was 23 and he was 24. They had six children, two of whom died in infancy.

== Death ==
Hannah Hoes died from tuberculosis on February 5, 1819, at age 35. During Van Buren's term, his daughter-in-law Angelica acted as hostess of the White House and First Lady of the United States. When writing his autobiography, Van Buren did not mention his wife once, possibly to shield her from public references.
