= Kinderhook (village), New York =

Kinderhook, New York
- Village
- Location of Kinderhook, New York
- Coordinates: 42°23′37″N 73°42′18″W
- Country: United States
- State: New York
- County: Columbia County
- Town: Kinderhook

Area
  - Total: 2.10 sq mi (5.45 km^{2})
  - Land: 2.10 sq mi (5.45 km^{2})
  - Water: 0 sq mi (0.00 km^{2})
- Elevation: 253 ft (77 m)

Population (2020)
  - Total: 1,170
  - Density: 556.1/sq mi (214.72/km^{2})
- Time zone: UTC-5 (Eastern (EST))
  - Summer (DST): UTC-4 (EDT)
- ZIP code: 12106
- Area code: 518
- FIPS code: 36-39562
- GNIS feature ID: 0954619
- Website: villageofkinderhook.org

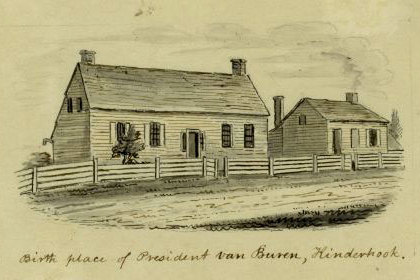
Van Buren's birthplace by John Warner Barber

Kinderhook (Kinderhoeck in Dutch) is a village in the town of Kinderhook in Columbia County, New York, United States. The village population was 1,170 at the 2020 census, slightly down from 1,211 at the 2010 census. The village of Kinderhook is located in the south-central part of the town on US 9. The eighth President of the United States, Martin Van Buren, was born in Kinderhook and retired to the area (Lindenwald).

== History ==
The area was named by Henry Hudson in 1609 as Kinderhoeck (Dutch for 'children's corner') because he had seen Native American children frequently playing there. First settled by the Dutch around 1640, the area was surrendered to the English in 1664.

In 1686, the area was granted the Great Kinderhook Patent and organized into one township.

Much of the area's growth did not occur until the 19th century - in 1813, the village had only twenty dwellings. By 1843, the number had grown to 86, and just seven years later, there were about 200 buildings and 1,400 inhabitants. The size of the village has remained steady since then, and the Kinderhook Village District has been listed on the National Register of Historic Places since 1974. In 1838, Kinderhook was chartered as a village.

United States President Martin Van Buren was born in the town of Kinderhook, and was known as "Old Kinderhook". The home where he was raised, his father's tavern, no longer exists; however, a historical marker is located near the site at 46 Hudson Street. The Martin Van Buren National Historic Site, Van Buren's retirement home is located 1 mile (1.6 km) south of the village and is open to the public. Van Buren's burial place is in the Kinderhook Reformed Church Cemetery along Albany Avenue in the northwest part of the village, about a half mile from his childhood home.

U.S. Route 9 runs through Kinderhook and intersects with Columbia County route 21 at the center of the village. Northwest of the intersection, CR 21 is known as Albany Avenue, while southeast it is called Hudson Street.

== Geography ==
Kinderhook is located at 42°23′37″N 73°42′18″W (42.393707, -73.705094).

According to the United States Census Bureau, the village has a total area of 2.1 square miles (5.4 km^{2}), all land. Kinderhook Creek, a tributary of the Hudson River, forms the southeastern boundary of the village.

== Demographics ==
Historical population
Census	Pop.	Note	%±
1890	963		—
1900	913		−5.2%
1910	698		−23.5%
1920	722		3.4%
1930	822		13.9%
1940	745		−9.4%
1950	853		14.5%
1960	1,078		26.4%
1970	1,233		14.4%
1980	1,377		11.7%
1990	1,293		−6.1%
2000	1,275		−1.4%
2010	1,211		−5.0%
2020	1,170		−3.4%
U.S. Decennial Census

As of the census of 2000, there were 1,275 people, 546 households, and 361 families residing in the village. The population density was 667.7 inhabitants per square mile (257.8/km^{2}). There were 576 housing units at an average density of 301.7 per square mile (116.5/km^{2}). The racial makeup of the village was 98.12% White, 0.63% Black or African American, 0.24% Native American, 0.08% Asian, 0.08% from other races, and 0.86% from two or more races. Hispanic or Latino of any race were 1.41% of the population.

There were 546 households, out of which 29.5% had children under the age of 18 living with them, 56.4% were married couples living together, 6.8% had a female householder with no husband present, and 33.7% were non-families. 29.9% of all households were made up of individuals, and 13.2% had someone living alone who was 65 years of age or older. The average household size was 2.34 and the average family size was 2.91.

In the village, the population was spread out, with 23.5% under the age of 18, 4.9% from 18 to 24, 23.7% from 25 to 44, 29.4% from 45 to 64, and 18.5% who were 65 years of age or older. The median age was 44 years. For every 100 females, there were 92.0 males. For every 100 females age 18 and over, there were 91.9 males.

The median income for a household in the village was $57,500, and the median income for a family was $69,115. Males had a median income of $46,827 versus $29,545 for females. The per capita income for the village was $29,047. About 0.3% of families and 2.3% of the population were below the poverty line, including 2.5% of those under age 18 and 2.9% of those age 65 or over.

== Education ==
Kinderhook is part of the Ichabod Crane Central School District.

== In popular media ==
In the season 5 finale of The Sopranos Kinderhook is mentioned and shown as the hiding place of Tony Blundetto.

== Notable people ==
- George McClellan, U.S. congressman
- Mordecai Myers, member of the New York State Assembly
- Martin Van Buren, 8th U.S. President

== Sister city ==
- Buren, Netherlands
