= Abraham Van Buren II =

United States Army paymaster, eldest son of US President Martin Van Buren

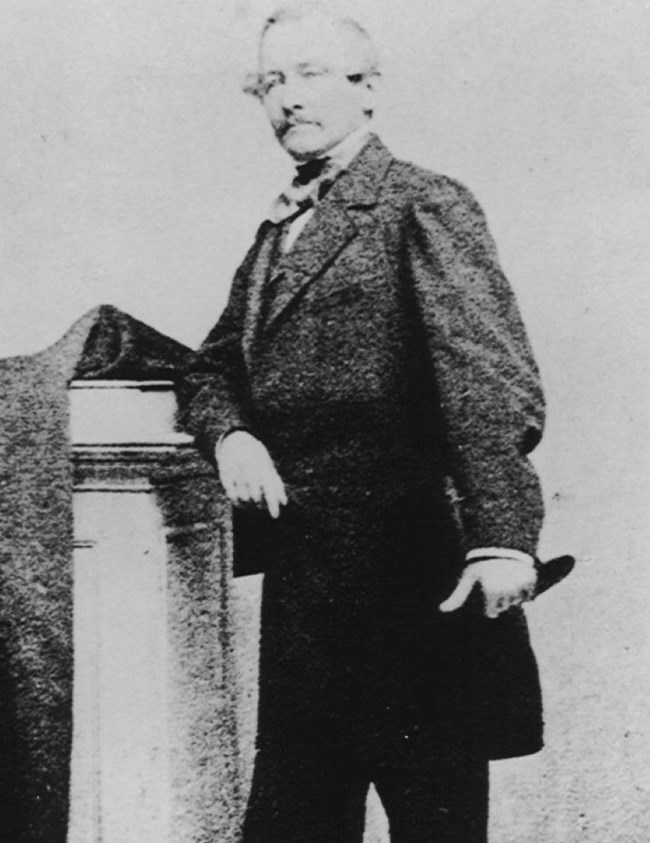
- Van Buren in 1860

Private Secretary to the President
- In office March 4, 1837 – March 4, 1841
- President: Martin Van Buren
- Preceded by: Andrew Jackson Donelson
- Succeeded by: Henry Huntington Harrison

Personal details
- Born: November 27, 1807 Kinderhook, New York, U.S.
- Died: March 15, 1873 (aged 65) New York City, New York, U.S.
- Resting place: Woodlawn Cemetery, New York City
- Spouse: Angelica Singleton Van Buren (m. 1838)
- Children: 4
- Parent(s): Martin Van Buren (father); Hannah Hoes (mother)
- Relatives: Abraham Van Buren (grandfather); John Van Buren (brother); James I. Van Alen (uncle)
- Occupation: Private secretary to President Martin Van Buren

Military service
- Allegiance: United States
- Branch/service: United States Army
- Years of service: 1827–1837; 1846–1854
- Rank: Major; Lieutenant Colonel (Brevet)
- Unit: United States Army Pay Department
- Battles/wars: Second Seminole War; Mexican–American War; Battle of Contreras; Battle of Monterrey; Siege of Veracruz; Battle of Cerro Gordo; Battle of Churubusco

Abraham Van Buren II (November 27, 1807 – March 15, 1873) was an American soldier and the eldest son of Martin Van Buren, the eighth President of the United States and his wife, Hannah Hoes Van Buren. A career soldier and veteran of the Second Seminole War and Mexican–American War, Van Buren was named in honor of his paternal grandfather Abraham Van Buren, an officer in the Albany County militia during the Revolutionary War.

Van Buren served as his father's private secretary during his father's presidential term. In his later years, he helped oversee management of his wife's South Carolina plantation and traveled extensively in Europe.

== Early life ==
Abraham Van Buren II was born in Kinderhook, New York on November 27, 1807, the eldest son of Martin Van Buren (1782–1862) and Hannah Hoes (1783–1819).

Van Buren was educated in Kinderhook and attended Greenville Academy. At age 15, Van Buren began attendance at the United States Military Academy. He graduated in 1827, ranked 37th of 38. Van Buren received his commission as a second lieutenant of Infantry.

== Career ==
=== Early career ===
After receiving his commission, Van Buren served with the 2nd Infantry Regiment at Jefferson Barracks, Missouri and Fort Dearborn, Illinois from 1827 to 1829. From 1829 to 1836 he served as aide-de-camp to Alexander Macomb, Commanding General of the United States Army. In 1833, Van Buren received promotion to first lieutenant.

In July 1836, Van Buren was promoted to captain in the 1st Dragoon Regiment. He served with his regiment in Florida during the Second Seminole War.

=== White House ===
On March 3, 1837, Van Buren resigned his commission so he could become the president's private secretary after his father was inaugurated on March 4. He remained in this position until the end of his father's term in March 1841.

Van Buren's time in the White House ended after his father was defeated by Whig candidate William Henry Harrison in the 1840 election. Van Buren and his wife Angelica left Washington in March 1841 and visited with Angelica's family in Sumter, South Carolina, where Angelica gave birth to their son Singleton.

=== Return to Army ===
At the outbreak of the Mexican–American War in June 1846, Van Buren was reappointed in the army as a paymaster with the rank of major. Van Buren served as an aide to Generals Zachary Taylor and Winfield Scott and took part in the Battle of Contreras, Battle of Monterrey, Siege of Veracruz, Battle of Cerro Gordo, and Battle of Churubusco.

In August 1847, Van Buren was promoted to lieutenant colonel by brevet to recognize his gallant and meritorious conduct during the battles of Contreras and Churubusco. Van Buren was an original member of the Aztec Club of 1847.

After Mexico's surrender, Scott appointed Van Buren as the military representative empowered to discuss peace terms with Mexican authorities. Van Buren joined American diplomat Nicholas Trist in the subsequent talks, which ended when Trist obtained Mexico's agreement to the settlement that was later ratified as the Treaty of Guadalupe Hidalgo.

Following his return to the United States, Van Buren aided Scott to prepare a defense of Scott's wartime conduct for a court of inquiry. He also gave testimony on Scott's behalf and the inquiry resulted in Scott's exoneration.

=== Later career ===
After his Mexican War service, Van Buren and his family settled in New York City. He had two strokes soon after relocating, and never completely regained his abilities to walk and speak. He continued to serve as an army paymaster until resigning in 1854. In retirement, he oversaw management of his wife's South Carolina plantation prior to the American Civil War and traveled extensively in Europe. In 1859, Van Buren sold his wife's plantation on her behalf, receiving $147,000 (nearly $5.5 million in 2021) for the 210 slaves purchased by a plantation owner from Arkansas.

In spite of his absence while serving in the military, Van Buren was still close to his father. His wife and he enjoyed extended stays at the former president's Lindenwald estate and spent winters in South Carolina.

== Personal life ==
=== Family ===
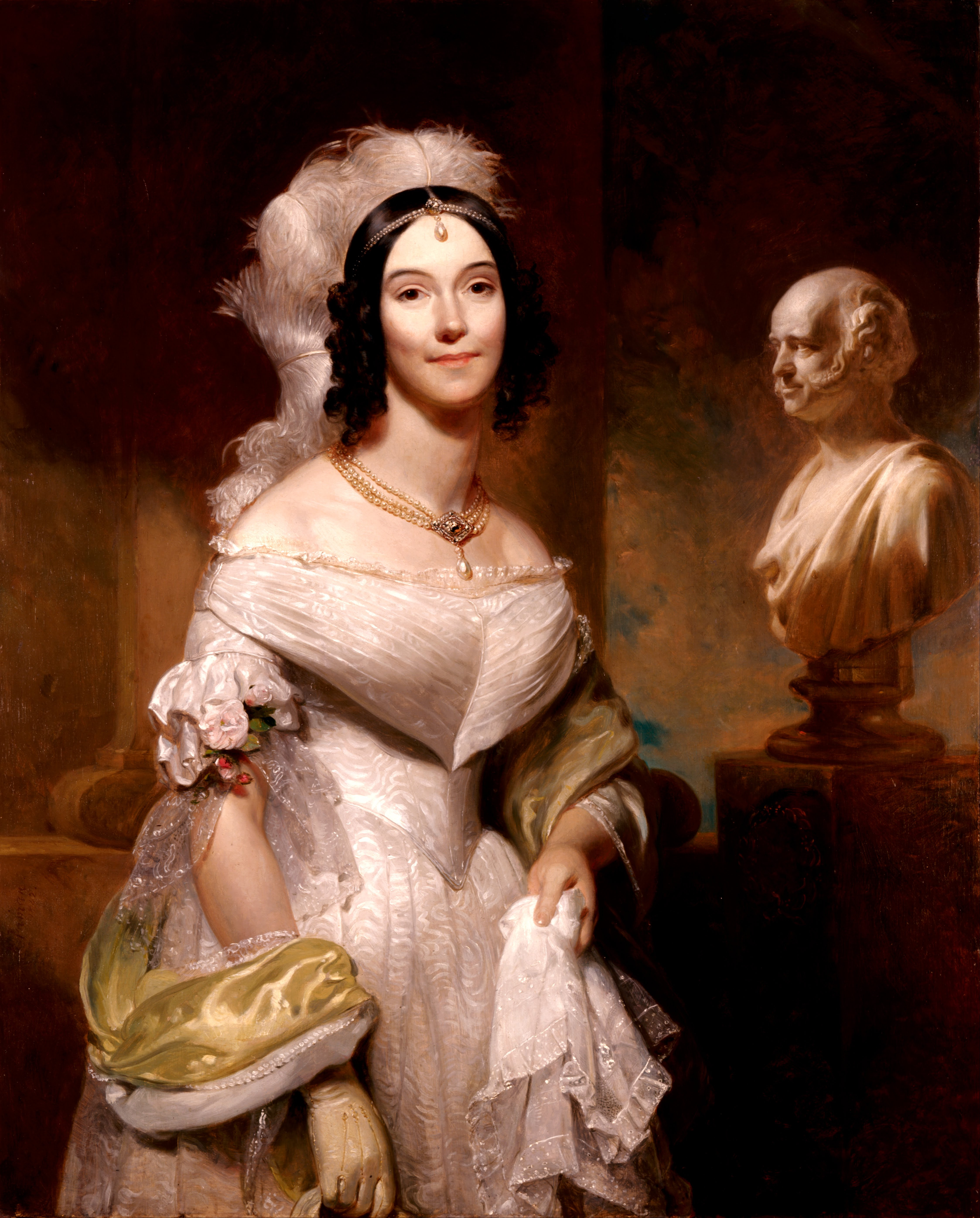
Portrait of Angelica Singleton Van Buren by Henry Inman, 1842

In 1838, Dolley Madison, widow of former President James Madison, introduced Van Buren to her cousin, Angelica Singleton (1818–1877), at a White House dinner hosted by his father. Singleton was a daughter of a wealthy South Carolina planter, and a refined lady who had been schooled in the fine arts at Madame Grelaud's French School in Philadelphia. Van Buren fell in love with her and the two were married at Colonel Richard Singleton's Wedgefield, South Carolina plantation named "Home Place". The President was unable to attend the couple's wedding; however, he was delighted with the match. The newlyweds honeymooned in London. Upon returning to the United States, Angelica assumed the duties of "White House Hostess" because her mother-in-law had died in 1819 and Martin Van Buren had not remarried. The couple had four children.

- Rebecca Van Buren (1840–1840), died young
- Singleton Van Buren (1841–1885)
- Martin Van Buren II (1844–1885)
- Travis Coles Van Buren (1848–1889)

=== Death and burial ===
Van Buren died in New York City on March 15, 1873. He was buried alongside his wife at Woodlawn Cemetery in the Bronx.

== Dates of rank ==
Van Buren's effective dates of rank were:

- Second Lieutenant of Infantry (Brevet) – July 1, 1827
- Second Lieutenant, 2nd Infantry – July 1, 1827
- First Lieutenant, 1st Dragoons – March 4, 1833
- Captain, 1st Dragoons – July 4, 1836
- Resigned – March 3, 1837
- Major, Pay Department – June 26, 1846
- Lieutenant Colonel (Brevet) – August 20, 1847
- Resigned – June 1, 1854
