= Angelica Singleton Van Buren =

First Lady of the United States from 1838 to 1841

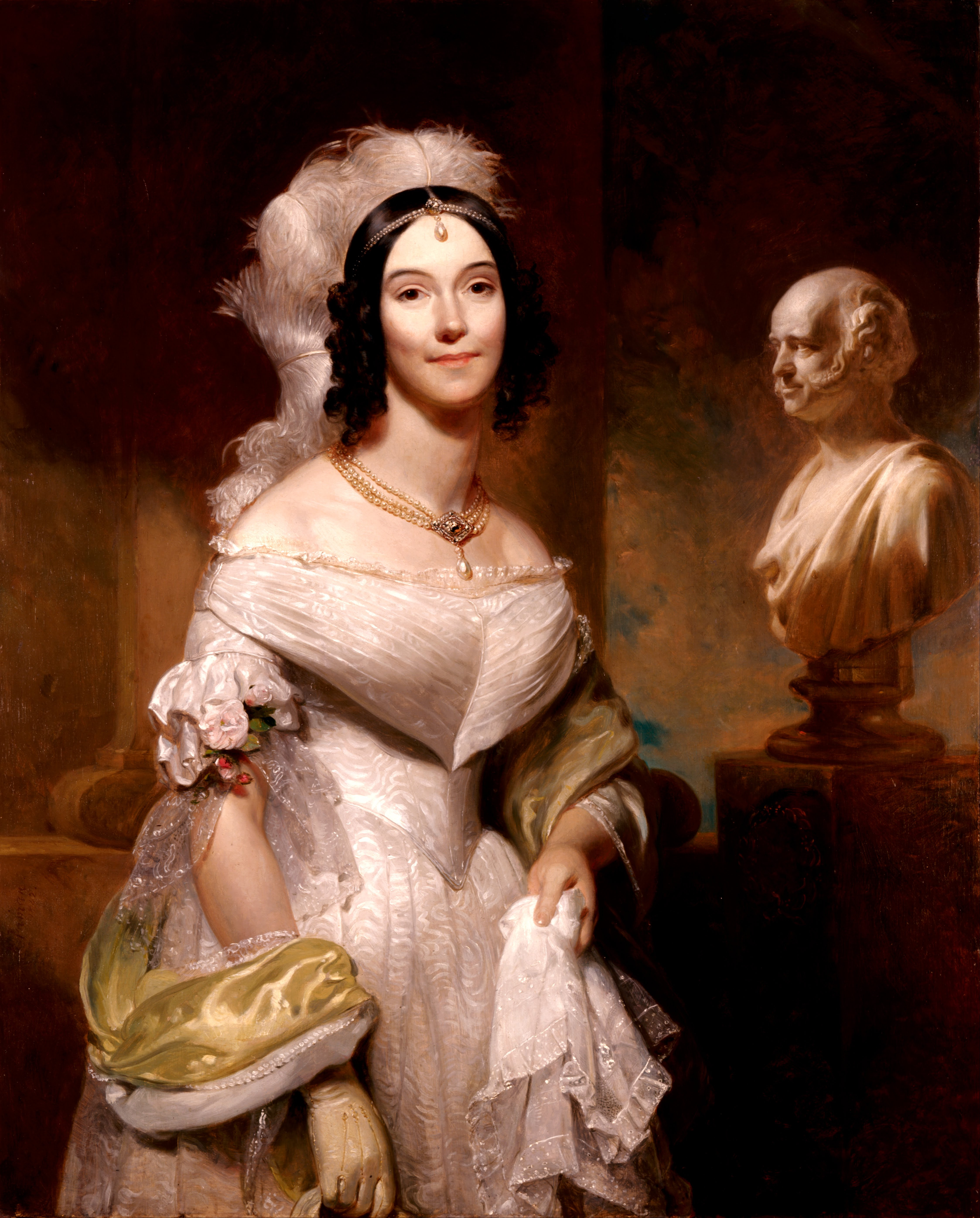
- Portrait of Angelica Singleton Van Buren by Henry Inman, 1842

First Lady of the United States
- Acting; November 27, 1838 – March 4, 1841
- President: Martin Van Buren
- Preceded by: Sarah Jackson
- Succeeded by: Anna Harrison; Jane Irwin Harrison

Personal details
- Born: Sarah Angelica Singleton; February 13, 1818 Wedgefield, South Carolina, U.S.
- Died: December 29, 1877 (aged 59) New York City, U.S.
- Spouse: Abraham Van Buren II (m. 1838; died 1873)
- Children: 4
- Education: Madame Grelaud's French School

Sarah Angelica Van Buren (née Singleton; February 13, 1818 – December 29, 1877) was an American heiress and a daughter-in-law of the eighth president of the United States, Martin Van Buren. She was married to the President's son, Abraham Van Buren II. She assumed the post of first lady because the president's wife, Hannah Van Buren, had died and he never remarried. She is the youngest woman ever to act as the White House hostess, assuming the role at the age of 20.

== Early life ==
Sarah Angelica Singleton was born in Wedgefield, South Carolina, on February 13, 1818. She was the fourth of six children born to Richard Singleton and his wife, Rebecca Travis Coles.

Angelica was educated at the Columbia Female Academy in South Carolina and Madame Grelaud's French School in Philadelphia for five years. She was a popular student at Madame Grelaud's and the school gave her the opportunity to meet a more diverse group of people.

== Marriage ==
In the winter of 1837-38, Angelica and her sister Marion stayed in Washington, DC with United States Senator William C. Preston, a cousin of their mother Rebecca Travis Coles. Another of their mother's cousins, former First Lady Dolley Madison, introduced the girls to Washington society. In March 1838, Madison decided to play matchmaker and introduced the girls to the bachelor sons of President Martin Van Buren. Angelica connected with the President's son Abraham, who shortly thereafter asked her to marry him. They married at her father's plantation in Wedgefield on November 27, 1838, Abraham's thirty-first birthday. Although he could not attend, Van Buren was supportive of the marriage and it strengthened his ties to the Old South.

== First Lady ==
Following the wedding, Van Buren assumed the duties of hostess at the White House with great success. This effectively made her the acting first lady of the United States, as her mother-in-law had died years earlier.

In 1839, the couple went to England where her uncle, Andrew Stevenson, was U.S. minister (now ambassador) to the United Kingdom. The trip, which also extended to other European countries, inspired Van Buren to introduce some European style and customs to White House functions. She also hoped to replicate the gardens of European palaces at the White House. However, these reforms were short-lived or never realized in full.

After the traditional New Year's Day reception in 1840, Van Buren ceased hostess duties and went into seclusion due to pregnancy. In March 1840, she gave birth to the couple's first child, a daughter named Rebecca; however, the child died shortly thereafter. Van Buren did not resume hostess duties after becoming pregnant a second time later that year.

The extravagancy displayed by Van Buren came amidst the prolonged Panic of 1837, which was caused in part from the policies of Van Buren and his predecessor. This eventually led to her becoming a target of her father-in-law's reelection campaign. In 1982, the Siena College Research Institute asked historians to assess American first ladies, including "acting" first ladies such as Van Buren. The survey, which has been conducted periodically since, ranks first ladies according to a cumulative score on the independent criteria of their background, value to the country, intelligence, courage, accomplishments, integrity, leadership, being their own women, public image, and value to the president. Van Buren was ranked by historians in the 1982 survey as the 36th most highly regarded out of the 42 listed. Acting first ladies such as Van Buren have been excluded from subsequent iterations of this survey.

== Post-Van Buren presidency ==
After Martin Van Buren was defeated for re-election in 1840, Angelica brought her family to Sumter, South Carolina while she was pregnant. In June 1841, she gave birth to her son Singleton (1841-1879). That fall, the President invited the family to live at his home of Lindenwald in Kinderhook, New York. Here, Angelica oversaw the household staff and continued hostess duties as Van Buren continued to be a pivotal figure in politics. Angelica and Abraham had two more sons, Martin II (1844-1885) and Travis Coles (1848-1889); and became the guardian of her niece Mary McDuffie (1830-1874), who became close to Martin Van Buren. In 1846, Abraham returned to the military at the start of the Mexican-American War, serving until his retirement in 1854. In 1848, Abraham and Angelica moved their family to New York City, where they would reside until their deaths.

In 1853, Angelica granted refuge to her sister Marion, who was escaping an abusive husband. South Carolina law had required Marion to transfer ownership of the property and assets of her first husband to her new husband, which she attempted to regain through state courts to little success. Angelica was enraged by the decision and attempted to intervene, but found that her political connections were unwilling to help due to the tension between factions of the Democratic party. From late 1854 to 1856, Abraham and Angelica took their family on a tour of Europe. During this tour, Angelica was exposed to the conditions of poverty through literature such as Household Words and Alton Locke. Through these experiences, Van Buren became interested in social reform and charity work, which she dedicated herself to upon her return to the United States.

Martin Van Buren died of asthma on July 24, 1862, at his home in Kinderhook, New York. He was 79 years old.

Abraham Van Buren died on March 15, 1873. Angelica died five years later on December 29, 1878, and was buried alongside her husband at Woodlawn Cemetery.

== See also ==
- Singleton's Graveyard, her family's plantation cemetery near Wedgefield, South Carolina
- Bibliography of United States presidential spouses and first ladies
- Bibliography of Martin Van Buren

== Sources ==
- James C. Welling (1914). "Martin Van Buren" . In James Grant Wilson (ed.). The Presidents of the United States, 1789–1914 .

Honorary titles
Vacant Title last held by Sarah Yorke Jackson; Acting	First Lady of the United States; 1839–1841	Succeeded by Anna Harrison
Vacant Title last held by Sarah Yorke Jackson; Acting	First Lady of the United States; 1839–1841	Succeeded by Jane Harrison; Acting
