= Reformed Dutch Church (Kinderhook, New York) =

Coordinates: 42.3933°N 73.7006°W

The Kinderhook Reformed Dutch Church located in Kinderhook, New York, was the sixth Church between Albany, New York and New York City. It was organized in 1712.

Its cemetery, in a separate location one mile northwest of the church, contains the grave of President Martin Van Buren.
