= Portrait of Angelica Singleton Van Buren =

Painting by Henry Inman

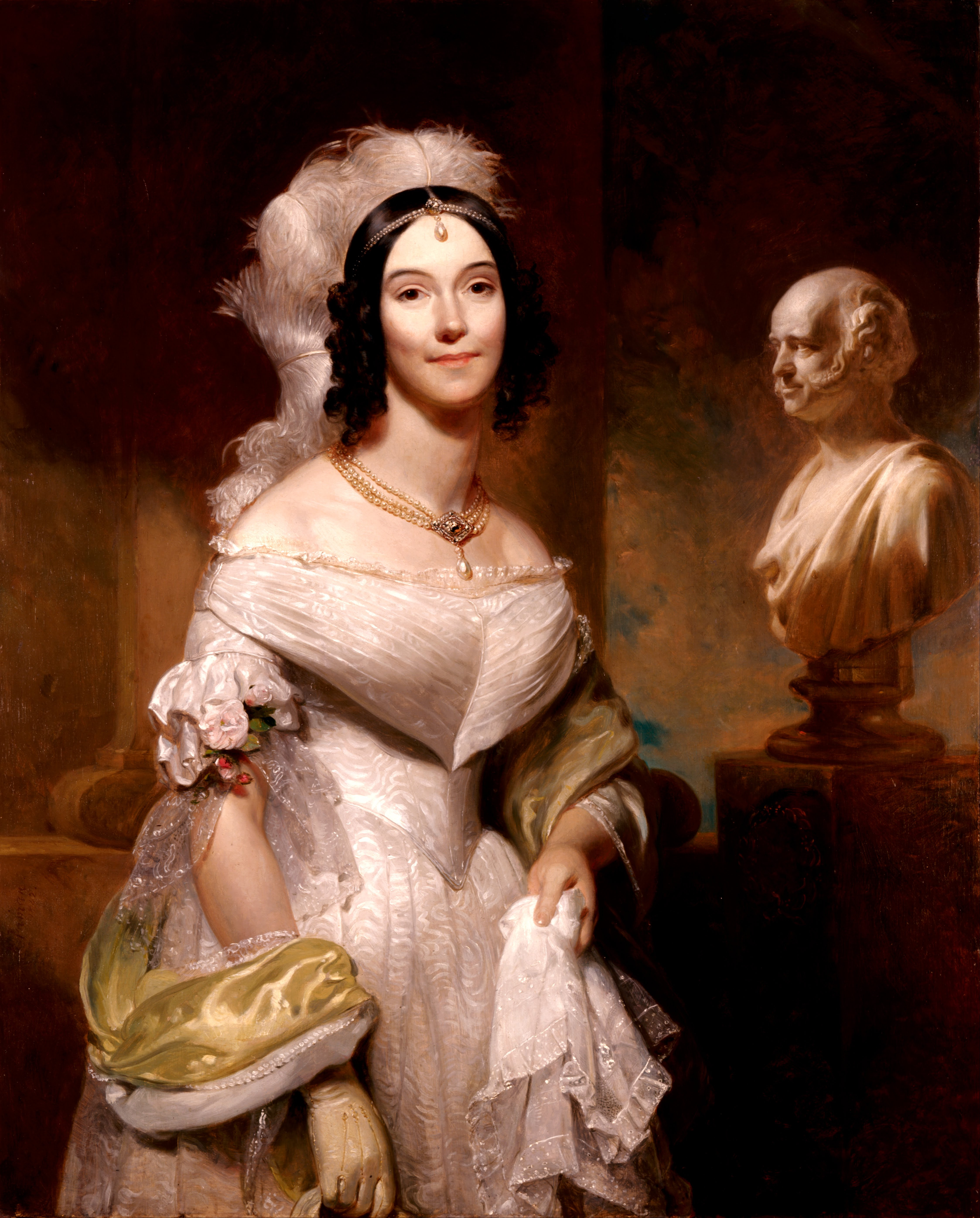
- Artist: Henry Inman
- Year: 1842
- Type: Oil on canvas, portrait painting
- Dimensions: 107.3 cm × 85.4 cm (42.2 in × 33.6 in)
- Location: White House; Washington D.C.

Portrait of Angelica Singleton Van Buren is an 1842 portrait painting by the American artist Henry Inman. It depicts the political hostess Angelica Singleton Van Buren. She was the daughter-in-law of the politician Martin Van Buren, who served as Vice President under Andrew Jackson who was then elected to the Presidency in 1837. As he was a widower, after her marriage in 1838 Angelica acted in the role of First Lady at receptions. She attempted to introduce the formal rituals practiced at the court of Queen Victoria in Britain.

Henry Inman was a noted and prolific portraitist of the early-to-mid nineteenth century. He depicts Angelica, then aged around twenty three, in the fashionable dress of the period with a sculpture of President Van Buren next to her. It was donated to the White House art collection in 1890.

== Bibliography ==
- Barratt, Carrie Rebora & Gerdts, William H. The Art of Henry Inman. Smithsonian Institution, 1987.
- Caldwell, John & Roque, Oswaldo Rodriguez. American Paintings in The Metropolitan Museum of Art. Vol. 1: A Catalogue of Works by Artists Born by 1815. Metropolitan Museum of Art, 1994.
- Kloss, William & Bolger, Doreen. Art in the White House: A Nation's Pride. White House Historical Association, 1992.
- Quick, Michael, Sadik, Marvin S. & Gerdts, William H. American Portraiture in the Grand Manner, 1720–1920. Los Angeles County Museum of Art, 1891.
