= Madame Grelaud's French School =

Girls boarding school in Philadelphia, Pennsylvania, U.S.

Information
- Other name: Madame Grelaud's Seminary
- Established: 1809
- Founder: Deborah Grelaud
- Closed: 1849
- Gender: Girls
- Language: French
- Annual tuition: $500

Madame Grelaud's French School, also called Madame Grelaud's Seminary, was a boarding school for girls in Philadelphia, Pennsylvania which ran from approximately 1809–1849. Many prominent northerners and southerners sent their daughters to such institutions to participate in rigorous academic curricula and learn about elite aspects of culture. The school is an example of the fashionable French-centered education, popular throughout the nineteenth century.

== Background ==
Deborah Grelaud emigrated as an exile from Saint-Domingue in 1793 during the Haitian Revolution. She fled with her four young children: John, Arthur, Titon, and Aurora. After spending a few years in Annapolis, Maryland, she moved to Philadelphia and opened the academy. Deborah Grelaud's husband is believed to have had a position with the successful merchant Stephen Girard, who was known to help refugees of the Haitian and French Revolutions. Her sons subsequently served as supercargoes on Girard's ships. Many refugees of both the French Revolution and the Haitian Revolution lived in destitution in the United States, despite their previous status. Whether or not Grelaud risked destitution, she and other exiles from Haiti, including Anne Marie Sigoigne and Charles and Marie Picot, opened French schools in Philadelphia to support themselves.

Grelaud was a widow when she opened her school in Philadelphia. Nevertheless, she possessed the skills to operate a successful school. Grelaud had been a woman of high social standing in Saint-Domingue. She had notable intellect, proficient training in music, and excellent administration skills. There is not a known portrait of Madame Grelaud, however, the artist Henry Dmochowski Saunders produced her likeness on a bronze medallion. Her name has also been spelled “Greland.”

Women's education grew in importance following the American Revolutionary War. The social elites sought the finest education for their daughters as education reflected class and could result in agreeable marriages. Philadelphia, a cosmopolitan city of the antebellum era, was an opportune setting for French boarding schools. Both northern and southern elites appreciated the cultured, sophisticated atmosphere and sent their daughters to such schools as Madame Grelaud's. While daughters learned the essentials of being a lady of the elite class, the arrangement encouraged and maintained valuable connections between Philadelphians of high status and southern planters.

== Locations ==
The first location of the school was 105 Mulberry Street. Grelaud moved her school to Germantown during the War of 1812 because many feared an attack on Philadelphia. She rented the Loudoun Mansion for the academy through the duration of the war and during the summer months of the school year from 1820 to 1835 or later. Loudoun is remembered as a site where wounded Americans were brought during the Battle of Germantown, some of whom were buried on the grounds. When Grelaud moved her school back to Philadelphia, she relocated to 89 South 3rd Street and remained there for ten years. In 1824 or 1825 she moved the school to a house on the next block at 102 South 3rd Street.

== Instruction ==
The school year at Madame Grelaud's began October 1 and went through August 31. The girls had the month of September for vacation. Each girl was required to bring an initialed silver mug and teaspoon for the school year. The girls wore coal scuttle bonnets with short, narrow frocks for school uniforms. Grelaud's students underwent a rigorous academic curriculum. Girls at these schools were expected to speak French fluently and to excel in history, philosophy, natural science, and geography. Ornamental subjects were also emphasized, including art, dance, languages, and music. Outings into the city provided opportunities to not only shop in upscale boutiques, but also to observe the manners and fashions of elite ladies and gentlemen. Parties and balls were also considered an important part of the young ladies' education, allowing practice in conversation and interaction with other members of the upper class. Madame Grelaud often hosted parties featuring accomplished musicians. She also allowed students to accept invitations to parties and the theater under proper supervision.

The cost for one year at Madame Grelaud's boarding school was $500, an exceptionally high fee and a reflection of the clientele. Madame Grelaud likely followed the examples of other French boarding institutions and charged beyond tuition for extra music or language lessons, laundry, and concert tickets. Young ladies left Madame Grelaud's school with highly cultivated intellect; however, these schools were not established to enhance a young woman's competitive edge for the workforce. As Daniel Kilbride explained, “Young women studied the sciences because gentlewomen were expected to be conversant with contemporary intellectual currents, not because they might use what they learned in the household or workplace.” This elitist teaching style was a cause for contempt to the growing American middle class. Middle-class women had educational opportunities in this period. The difference was that these schools taught with the understanding that education provided opportunity for upward mobility and supported the ideals of independence and democracy. Women could use this education to be useful members of society. Middle-class girls usually learned only the basics of "reading, writing, geography, arithmetic, and needlepoint." While these educators saw the importance of learning French, the lingua franca of the day, they often rejected the ornamental subjects such as painting, drawing, and dance. Because elite academies favored European culture over that of the new Republic, many reformers considered them un-American. They argued that students learned skills necessary for only a leisure class.

== Notable students ==
Several notable women attended Madame Grelaud's academy:

- Varina Davis – the First Lady of the Confederacy, attended the academy twice.
- Sarah Dorsey – writer, attended with Varina Davis
- Maria Hester Monroe – daughter of U.S. President James Monroe, attended from about 1815 through 1819 and played the harp and piano.
- Angelica Singleton Van Buren – U.S. President Martin Van Buren's daughter-in-law and First Lady, also attended the school.
- Antoinette and Caroline – nieces of Stephen Girard, entered the school in 1809 and 1812.
- Eliza Law, Columbia Peter, and America Peter – great grandchildren of Martha Washington attended the school

Most of the girls that attended Madame Grelaud's French School were Episcopalian, but Roman Catholics and Sephardic Jews were also enrolled.
