= Pet banks =

Pet banks is a derogatory term for state banks selected by the U.S. Department of Treasury to receive surplus Treasury funds in 1833. Pet banks are sometimes confused with wildcat banks. Although the two are distinct types of institutions that arose concomitantly, some pet banks were known to also engage in practices of wildcat banking. They were chosen among the big U.S. banks when President Andrew Jackson vetoed the recharter for the Second Bank of the United States, proposed by Henry Clay four years before the recharter was due. Clay intended to use the rechartering of the bank as a topic in the upcoming election of 1832. The charter for the Second Bank of the United States, which was headed by Nicholas Biddle, was for a period of twenty years beginning in 1816, but Jackson's distrust of the national banking system (which he claimed to be unconstitutional) led to Biddle's proposal to recharter early, and the beginning of the Bank War. Jackson cited four reasons for vetoing the recharter, each degrading the Second Bank of the United States in claims of it holding an exorbitant amount of power. These reasons for vetoing the recharter were centered around Jackson's belief in his role as the representative of the common man. Amos Kendall, who was the intellectual driving force behind Jackson's 1832 election and Jackson himself, led Jackson to believe that the bank posed a political threat to Jackson. Kendall cautioned Jackson that unless he got rid of the Second Bank of the United States, it would find a way to elect its own candidate to the White House after Jackson was gone. Jackson saw the bank as a threat to the common man and "the great enemy of republicanism", and argued that as long as the national bank existed, the working class was constantly in danger of losing their stake in government.

The term "pet banks" gained currency because most of the banks were chosen not because of monetary fitness but on the basis of the spoils system, which rewarded friends and political allies of Andrew Jackson with positions in government. After winning reelection in 1832 significantly due to his argument for the removal of the Second Bank of the United States, Jackson ordered the removal of the government's deposits in the Second Bank of the United States to these pet banks, which were essentially state-chartered banks that were loyal to the Jackson administration because of the spoils system. By 1833 there were 23 "pet banks" or state banks with US Treasury funds. The institution of these pet banks led to a huge increase in land speculation, mainly due to the managers' inability to effectively handle and control the nation's money. The nation's banking capital, loans, and note circulation all increased by an incredible amount during the period of the pet banks because of the unqualified management, leading to an increase in land speculation during this period.

Most pet banks eventually lost money and didn't succeed in their investments, partially because the 23 pet banks were not sufficient to hold the entirety of the public's money. The pet banks and smaller "wildcat" banks flooded the country with paper currency. Because this money became so unreliable, Jackson issued the Specie Circular, which required all public lands to be purchased with gold and/or silver. Eventually, the way that all of the government's funds were spread throughout the country because of pet banks made it so that it was near impossible to mobilize the remaining money in the specie reserves, which were the reserves of gold and silver created by the Specie Circular. These factors ultimately contributed to the major dip in the economy that was dubbed the Panic of 1837.
