= Wild Cat scheme =

== American football ==
- Wildcat formation

== Other uses ==
- Wildcat strike action, a strike action of workers that is not authorized by union leadership
- Wildcatter, a person who drills for oil in areas not yet known to have oil fields
- Wildcat banking, the unusual practices of banks chartered under state law from 1816 to 1863 in the United States
