= Oshea Wilder =

Oshea Wilder (1784–1846) was an early pioneer to southwest Michigan. Born 16 July 1784 in Gardner, Massachusetts to Elijah and Azubah (Wells) Wilder, he initially made his living as a blacksmith before entering the military to fight in the War of 1812. On 4 February 1813, Wilder married Cornelia Anthony (1791–1866), daughter of John and Sarah (Shaw) Anthony. In the 1820s, they toured Europe, settling in New York and Paterson, New Jersey upon their return to the United States. Wilder was active with the Presbyterian Church, and was a founding member of the First Presbyterian Church in Paterson.

== Michigan Pioneer ==
In 1831, the Wilders pioneered the area around present-day Marshall, Michigan in Calhoun County where Oshea worked as a land surveyor. The same year, the Ketchum Brothers arrived from New York, and Wilder assisted them in the founding of the village of Marshall. By 1835, the Village of Marshall had a population of 300.

In 1834, Michigan territorial governor Stevens T. Mason appointed him to a three-person committee to determine Allegan County's county seat. In 1836, he purchased a 100-acre (0.40 km^{2}) plot of land in Allegan County, along the shore of Lake Michigan. On that land, and with the support of Lancaster Bank of Massachusetts, he established the village of Singapore.

One early feature of the town was that it had its own bank. Michigan law required that banks have funds enough on hand to cover at least 1/3 of bank notes that it printed. By 1838, over $50,000 in Singapore Bank notes had been placed in circulation.

Wilder deserted the town in 1846, moving back to Calhoun County. James Carter of New York bought out Wilder's interest in the town and moved there to oversee his investment. Wilder died in Eckford, Michigan 6 November 1847.
