= Singapore, Michigan =

Ghost town in Michigan, US

- Ghost town
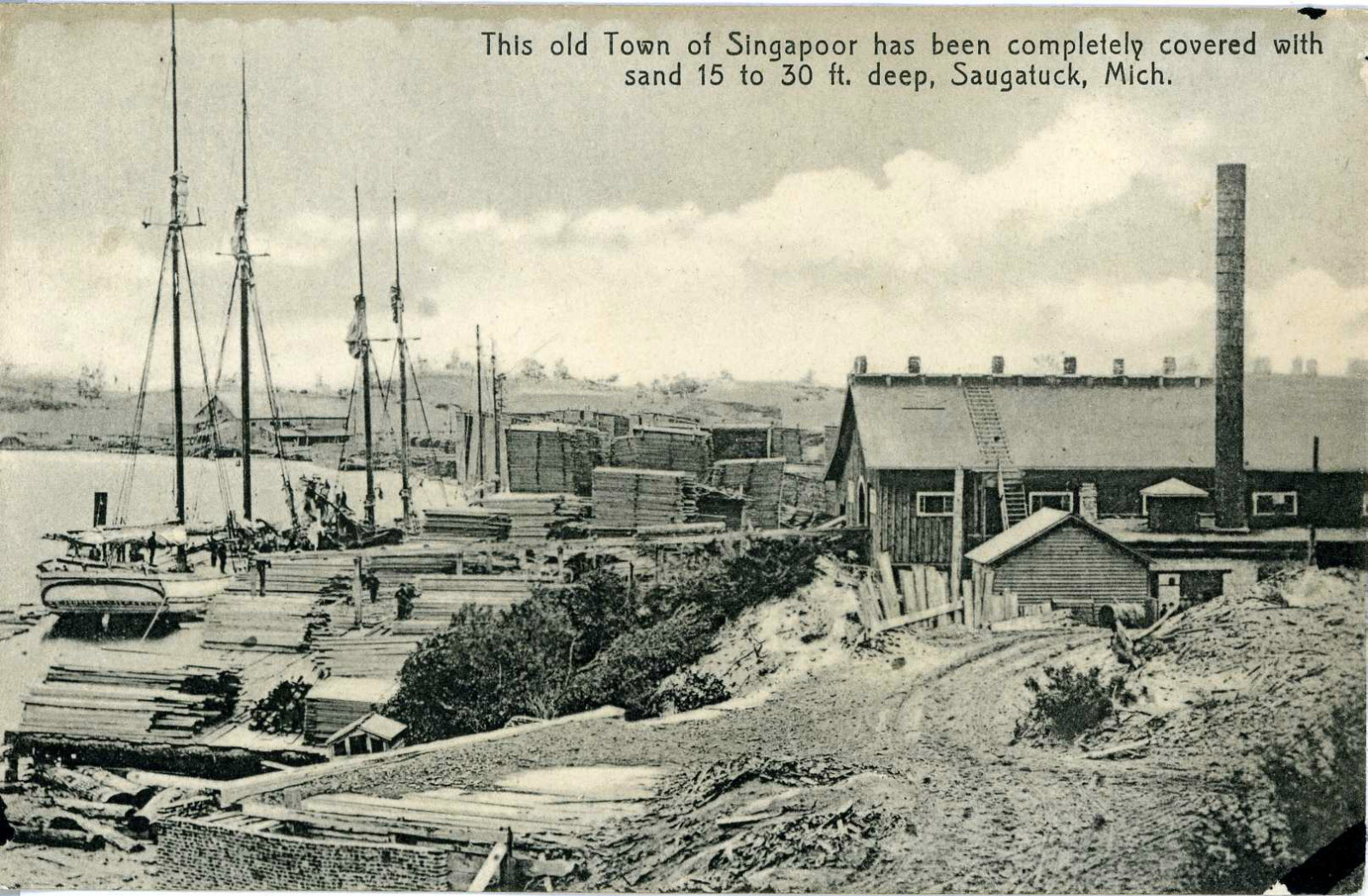
- Historic image of a sawmill prior to 1870

- Location within Michigan Location within the United States
- Coordinates: 42°40′39″N 86°12′20″W
- Country: United States
- State: Michigan
- County: Allegan
- Township: Saugatuck
- Settled: 1836
- Abandoned: 1875
- Named for: Singapore
- Elevation: 597 ft (182 m)
- Time zone: UTC-5 (Eastern (EST))
  - Summer (DST): UTC-4 (EDT)
- ZIP code: 49453 (Saugatuck)
- Area code: 269
- GNIS feature ID: 1618375

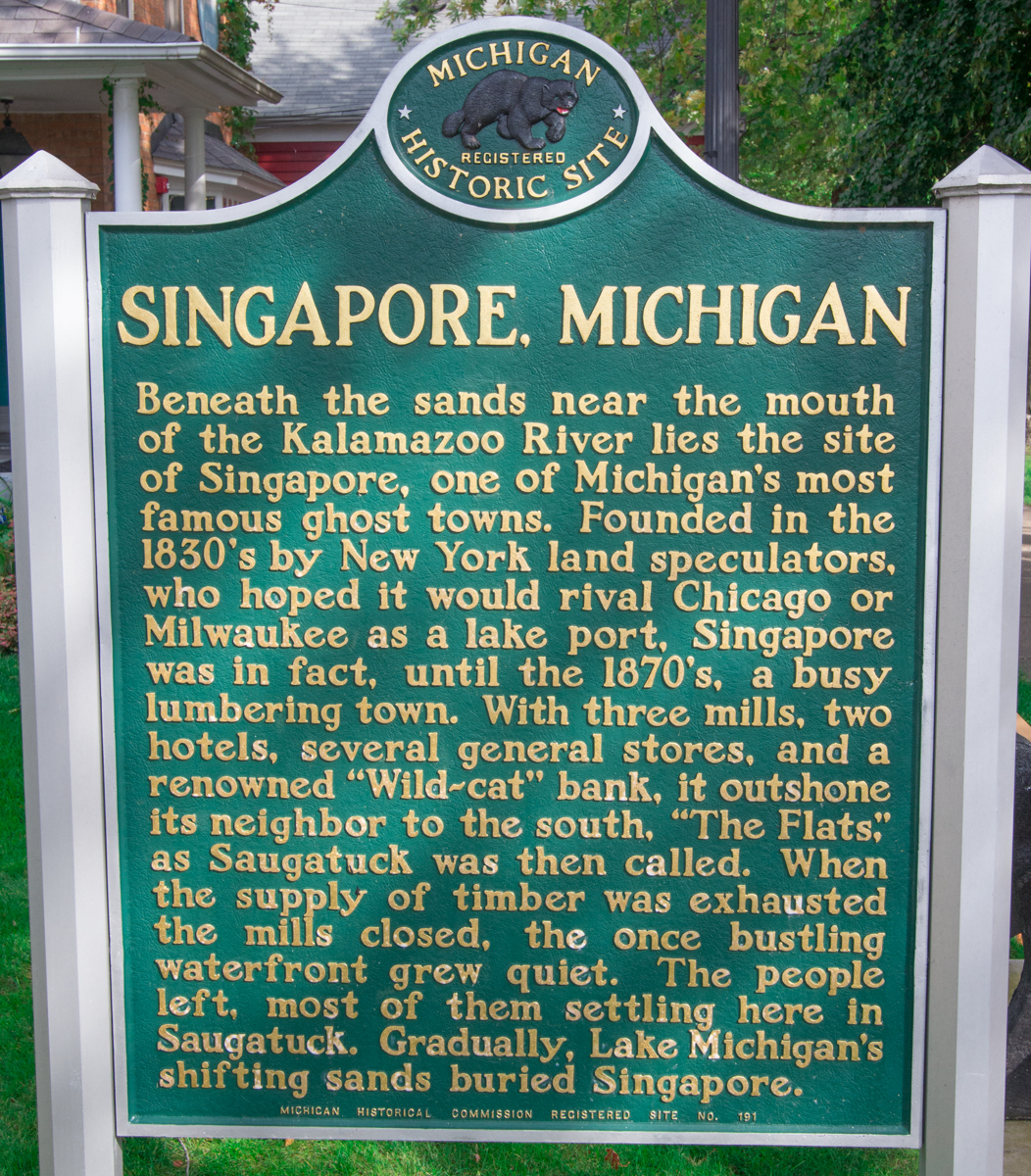
Michigan Historic marker commemorating Singapore

Singapore is a ghost town in Michigan, United States. It was a casualty of erosion after the surrounding woods were deforested—exacerbated by the need for lumber to rebuild several Midwestern cities and towns ravaged by fires in 1871. Its ruins are now buried beneath the sand dunes of the Lake Michigan shoreline at the mouth of the Kalamazoo River in Saugatuck Township, near the cities of Saugatuck and Douglas in Allegan County.

It was founded in 1836 by New York land speculator Oshea Wilder, who hoped to build a port town to rival Chicago and Milwaukee. At its height, the town boasted three mills, two hotels, several general stores, and a bank and was home to Michigan's first schoolhouse. In total, the town consisted of 23 buildings and two sawmills.

== Bank scandal ==
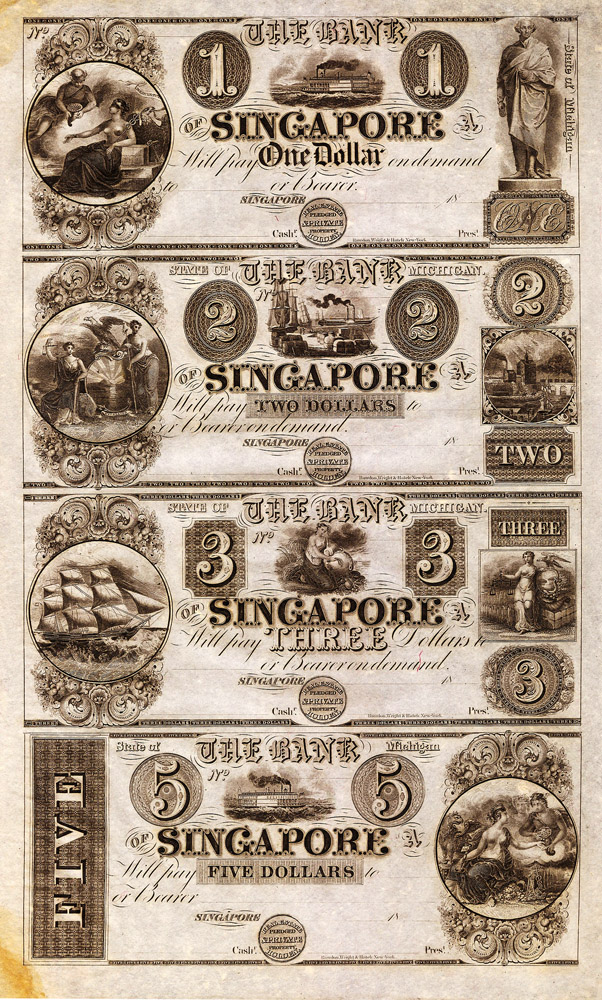
Notes from the Bank of Singapore

In 1838, two short-lived "wildcat" banks were established in Allegan County: the Bank of Allegan and the Bank of Singapore. Both issued their own banknotes and were required to hold enough hard currency (specie) to cover at least one-third of the circulating banknotes. However, neither Singapore nor Allegan was at that level.

By 1838, over $50,000 in Singapore notes had circulated. Shortly after the Civil War, Singapore and many other Michigan banks were involved in a bank scandal. Inspectors required them to produce the specie to support their notes, and when they could not do so, they were dissolved.

Occasionally, collectors come across notes issued by the Bank of Singapore. There are a few known full sheets before they were cut into individual notes, sometimes signed and sometimes unsigned by the bank president or authorized personnel at the time.

== 40-day blizzard ==
The 40-Day Blizzard of 1842 might have wiped out the people of Singapore had it not been for the shipwreck of the Milwaukie, laden with barrelled flour, just off its shore. Several barrels washed ashore and fed the people of Singapore until the blizzard blew over.

== Change of ownership ==
Wilder deserted the town in 1846, moving back to Calhoun County. James Carter of New York bought out Wilder's interest in the town and moved there to oversee his investment. It was only two years after that that Carter sold the town to his brother, Artemas, and Francis B. Stockbridge. Artemas was more innovative than his brother, and very soon after arriving, he and Stockbridge built the first three-masted schooner on Lake Michigan, dubbed the Octavia, to carry lumber from Singapore to Chicago. Carter was bought out by Stockbridge in 1850, and the decade proved to be one of prosperity for Stockbridge and the town, which boasted a population of several hundred people by 1871.

== Singapore's demise ==
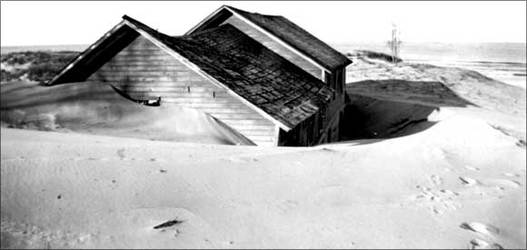
Houses being covered by sand dunes

After fires swept through Chicago, Holland, Peshtigo, and Manistee in late 1871, the area around Singapore was almost completely deforested to supply lumber for rebuilding. Without a protective tree cover, the winds and sands blowing off Lake Michigan quickly eroded the town into ruins and, within four years, completely covered it. The town was vacated by 1875.

Today, Singapore lives on only in the name of the Singapore Yacht Club at one end of town. Just as the "cow kicking over the lantern" story was born out of the Great Chicago Fire, this event also gave birth to a legend. The story persists that one resident of Singapore refused to move, even as the sand enveloped his home. Eventually, he had to enter and leave the dwelling by a second-floor window, and he stayed until the sand reached the roof.

The story of the rise and demise of Singapore, Michigan, was quoted by Singaporean Prime Minister Lawrence Wong in his maiden National Day Rally speech on August 18, 2024, while he was an alumnus of the University of Michigan, Ann Arbor.
