= Wildcat banking =

Period of banking in U.S. history

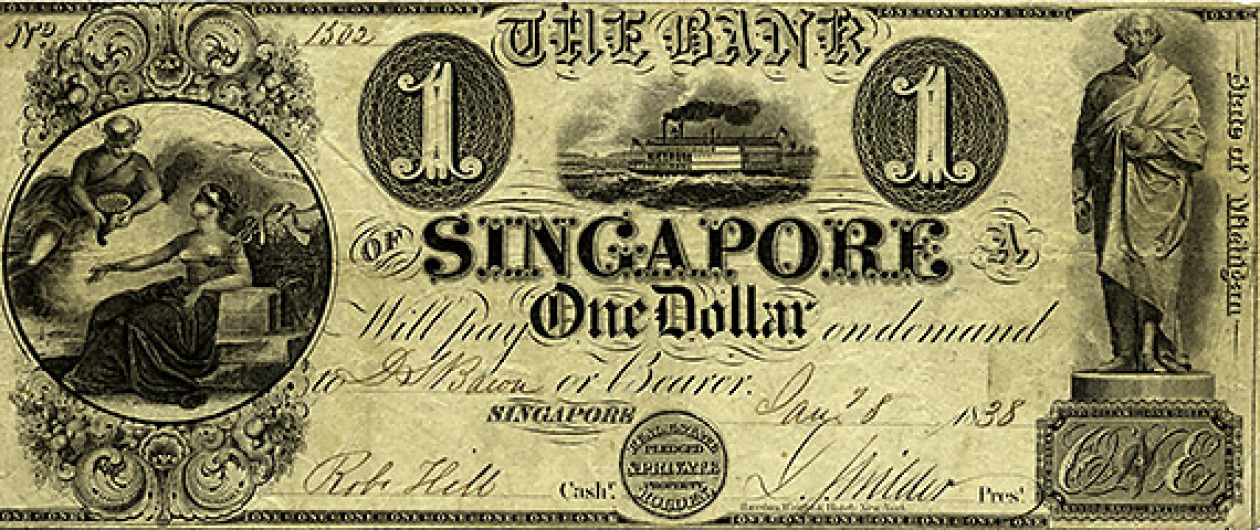
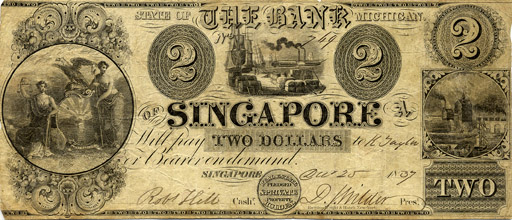
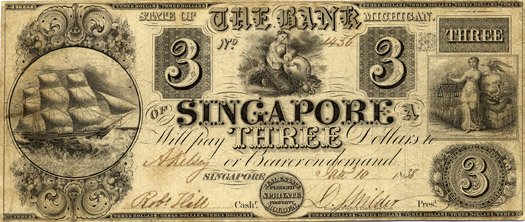
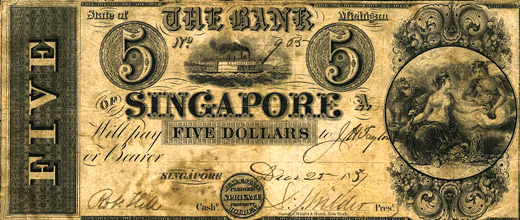
Notes of the Bank of Singapore, Michigan

Wildcat banking was the issuance of paper currency in the United States by poorly capitalized state-chartered banks. These wildcat banks existed alongside more stable state banks during the Free Banking Era from 1836 to 1865, when the country had no national banking system. States granted banking charters readily and applied regulations ineffectively, if at all. Bank closures and outright scams regularly occurred, leaving people with worthless money.

Operating in remote locations with limited or absent financial infrastructure, wildcat banks supplied a medium of exchange in the form of bearer notes that they issued on their own credit. These notes were formally redeemable in specie (i.e. gold or silver coins) but typically collateralized by other assets such as government bonds or real estate notes, or occasionally by nothing at all. Hence they carried a risk that the bank could not redeem them on demand.

== Terminology ==
A wildcat bank is broadly defined as one that prints more currency than it is capable of continuously redeeming in specie. A more specific definition, established by historian of economics Hugh Rockoff in the 1970s, applies the term to free banks whose notes were backed by overvalued securities – bonds which were valued at par by the state, but which had a market value below par.

The earliest attested use in the Oxford English Dictionary is an 1838 reference to "'Wild Cat' money" in the Albany newspaper The Jeffersonian.

A number of etymological explanations for the term have been proposed. The OED suggests that the term may have originated as a reference to the notes of a particular Michigan bank which bore the emblem of a panther (which were locally referred to as "wild cats"). The collection of Eric P. Newman includes a counterfeit purporting to be an 1828 note from Catskill Bank in New York, which features an image of a mountain lion and which has been described as the "true wild cat note". Another proposed explanation relates to the practice of establishing such banks in remote locations in the wilderness, where wild cats might be found, in order to impede people from reaching the bank to redeem their notes. A third explanation relates to an act of the Missouri Territory in 1816 to incentivize the killing of wolves, panthers, and wildcats near inhabited areas. For each animal scalp, a person would be compensated with a certificate bearing some monetary value, which was accepted as legal tender for the payment of local taxes. These "wildcat certificates" came to be used as currency and hence, the story goes, the "wildcat" qualifier came to be applied to other forms of currency which were not readily redeemable in specie, including the notes of certain banks.

== Forerunners ==
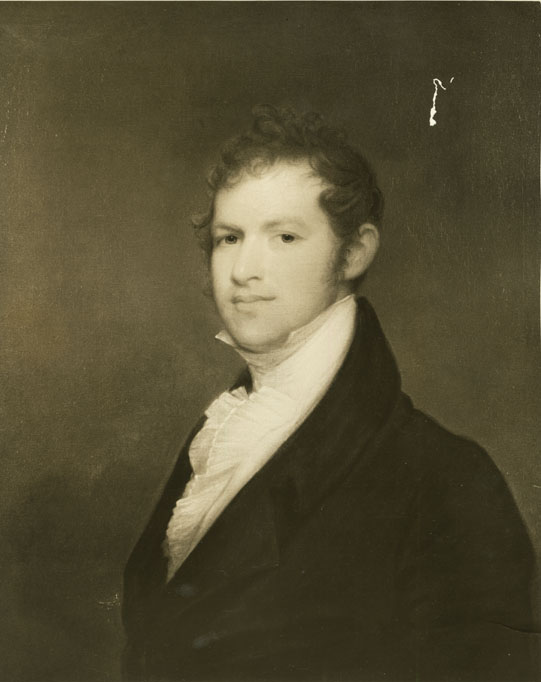
Andrew Dexter Jr., a wildcat banking pioneer

=== New England country banks ===
The earliest example of what came to be called wildcat banking began in New England during the 1790s. The banking establishment of Boston was opposed by a greater number of country banks throughout the region. Because the city banks refused the country banks' currency, it came to dominate the commercial activity of Boston, while the city banks' notes were paid directly back to them. Country bankers soon understood that distance from the city was an advantage, since notes that found their way to Boston did not easily return for payment. In the mid-1800s businessman Andrew Dexter Jr. acquired interests in several of these remote banks to support his construction of a central money exchange in Boston. He borrowed extravagantly from the banks and flooded the city with newly issued notes. These included the Farmers' Exchange Bank of Gloucester, located in the isolated village of Chepachet, Rhode Island; the Berkshire Bank, located in Pittsfield at the other end of Massachusetts; and even the Detroit Bank, which Dexter's associates had established more than 600 miles (970 km) away in the newly organized Michigan Territory. When the scheme unraveled in 1809, the Berkshire Bank received more notes for payment in one day than the entire amount outstanding on its books. Farmers' Exchange Bank made history as the first American bank to fail, with $86 on hand to pay $580,000 in notes.

=== First federal bank interim ===
Another period of credit expansion by state banks occurred after the expiration of the First Bank of the United States in 1811, culminating in the Panic of 1819. The Bank's prompt collection of state bank notes had enforced a degree of responsibility that soon faded. The burning of Washington in late 1814 during the War of 1812 prompted bank runs across the eastern seaboard and the suspension of specie payments by state governments. City governments and every sort of business resorted to paying their expenses with notes and shinplasters, and the expansion of money could not easily be reined in after the war had ended. The urgent need to restore coins to circulation was one argument in favor of creating a Second Bank of the United States. Senator Samuel Smith, advocating for a national bank, called the backcountry banks of the period "caterpillars of the nation," pests that starved the country of credible money. The new Bank was established in 1816 and started to liquidate the government's holdings of state bank notes over several years, during which state banks continued to proliferate.

When bank charters were not available, entrepreneurs found other ways of entering the business. In New York, the law prohibited anyone from forming a corporation for the purpose of banking without a state charter, but did not prevent banking as a side business. By the time the legislature closed the loophole in 1818, the businesses exploiting it included aqueduct companies, turnpike companies, tavern-keepers and glass-makers. Unchartered banking associations were created in the western regions of Virginia and Pennsylvania to supply the credit needs of local settlers, as well as in Kentucky and Ohio. A traveler in the latter states observed "much trouble with paper money" at the end of 1818 that could only lead to "penance" and the return to a smaller money stock. By that time a policy shift by the Second Bank was already underway. In response to declining crop prices, it called upon state banks for cash payment of the notes that it held. The Bank's call was followed by a collapse in prices for American agricultural exports. Real estate prices plummeted amid foreclosures, businesses were ruined and a two-year recession followed. The crisis left the Bank in better financial condition and the remaining state banks more accountable, but also left resentment of the Bank's harsh approach.

== Background of free banking ==
=== Jacksonian bank policy ===
In 1833, as part of his effort to break the political power of the Second Bank, President Andrew Jackson ordered the removal of federal funds from the Bank to favored state banks, known as pet banks. He subsequently signed the Deposit Act of 1836, which continued the federal subsidy to state banks and prevented the Secretary of the Treasury from regulating credit expansion by those banks in the manner that the Second Bank had. He also issued the Specie Circular, which required federal land sales to be paid in silver or gold coin and had the effect of drawing those coins from the coast to the developing interior. A collapse in the price of cotton in 1836 led the Bank of England to limit the flow of money to the United States. This, along with the failure of domestic businesses involved in cotton production, produced the Panic of 1837 and an economic depression lasting roughly five years. Businesses, especially in the west, found it difficult to obtain the hard money to which they had been accustomed and turned to creative methods of finance. In subsequent years Democratic Party politicians continued to oppose centralized banking, and the Supreme Court ruled in Briscoe v. Bank of Kentucky that states could issue currency only on the credit of private parties, not that of the state.

=== Prevalence of wildcat banks ===
The experience of free banking varied across the country. As a system of independent banks chartered by independent legislatures, it suffered from inconsistency, inconvenience and risk, but not every privately organized state bank was a fraudulent or reckless "wildcat." Even relatively well-run banks could fail to pay out if a drop in a state's credit devalued the bonds that secured the bank's notes, or if a crisis such as the outbreak of war shook public confidence.

== Free banking in Michigan ==
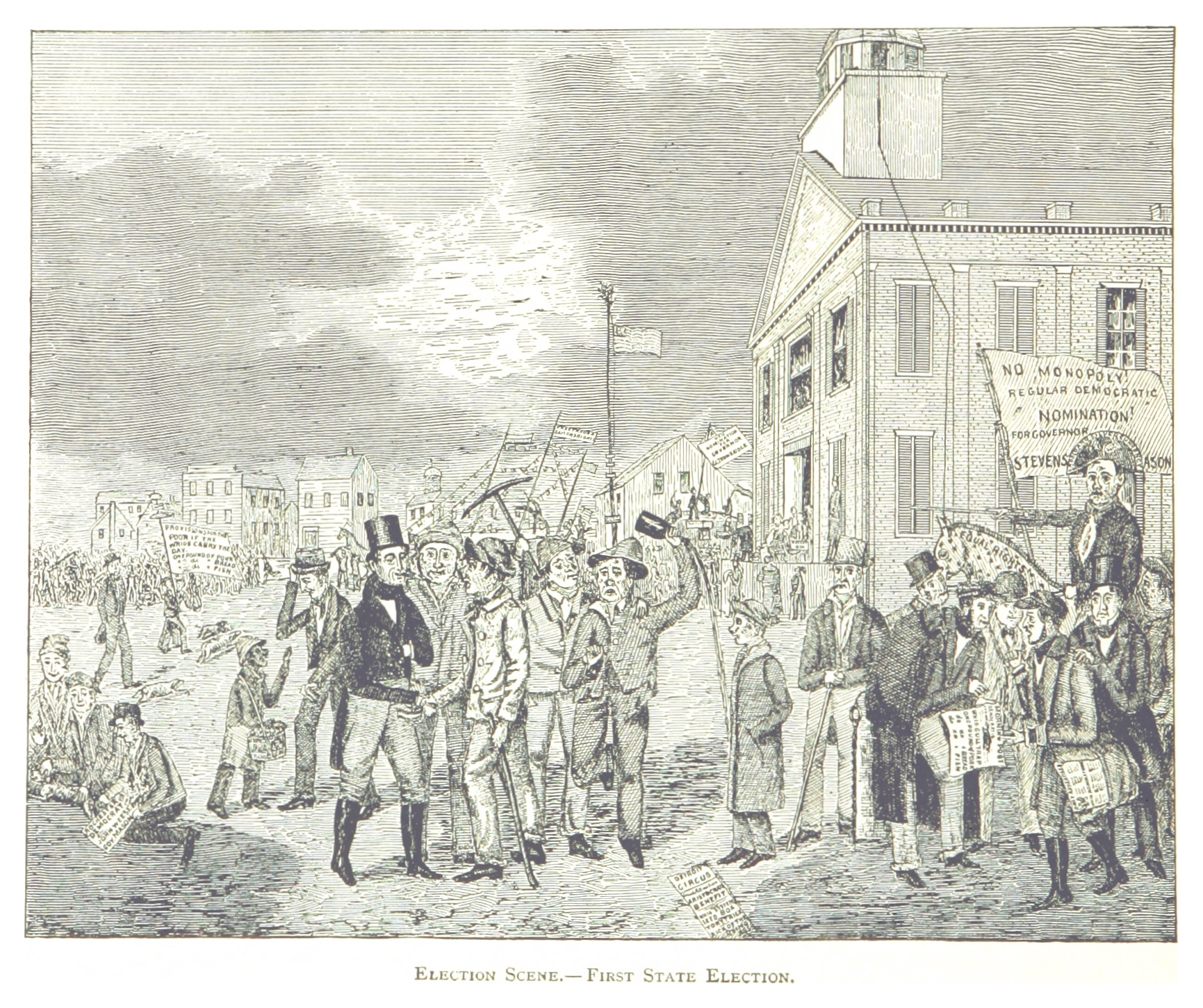
Jacksonian Democrats in Michigan advocated for free banking rather than a state monopoly.

The term "wildcat banking" arose in reference to the Michigan banking boom of the late 1830s. Promptly upon becoming a state in 1837, Michigan passed the General Banking Act, which allowed any group of landowners to organize a bank by raising at least $50,000 capital stock and depositing notes on real estate with the government as security for their bank notes. This law was unprecedented in a country where legislatures normally chartered each bank with a separate act. Although it was a regulated system in theory, the commissioners appointed to regulate the banks lacked the resources to do so effectively. A total of 49 banks were established, a surprising number given the capital requirement, and in time several were found to have cheated the law by watering their stock with phony contributions or passing cash from one bank to another ahead of the visiting commissioners.

The banks issued currency notes that could be redeemed in specie only at rural locations, assuming cash was on hand. Commissioner Alpheus Felch recalled that one bank's "cash reserves" consisted of boxes of nails and glass topped with silver coins. Anyone who received the notes had to discount them according to their expected redemption value. According to a contemporary newspaper report:

Michigan money is thus classed—First quality, Red Dog; second quality, Wild Cat; third quality, Catamount. Of the best quality, it is said, it takes five pecks to make a bushel.

In response to these abuses, Michigan suspended new charters under the act. It attempted to create a single closely regulated state bank modeled on the neighboring Bank of Indiana, but was unable to raise the necessary capital. States continued to experiment with banking regulation in the absence of a federal policy; Arkansas amended its constitution in 1846 to prohibit the establishment of banks, while Iowa outlawed banks until that restriction was changed in 1857.

== Railroad banks ==
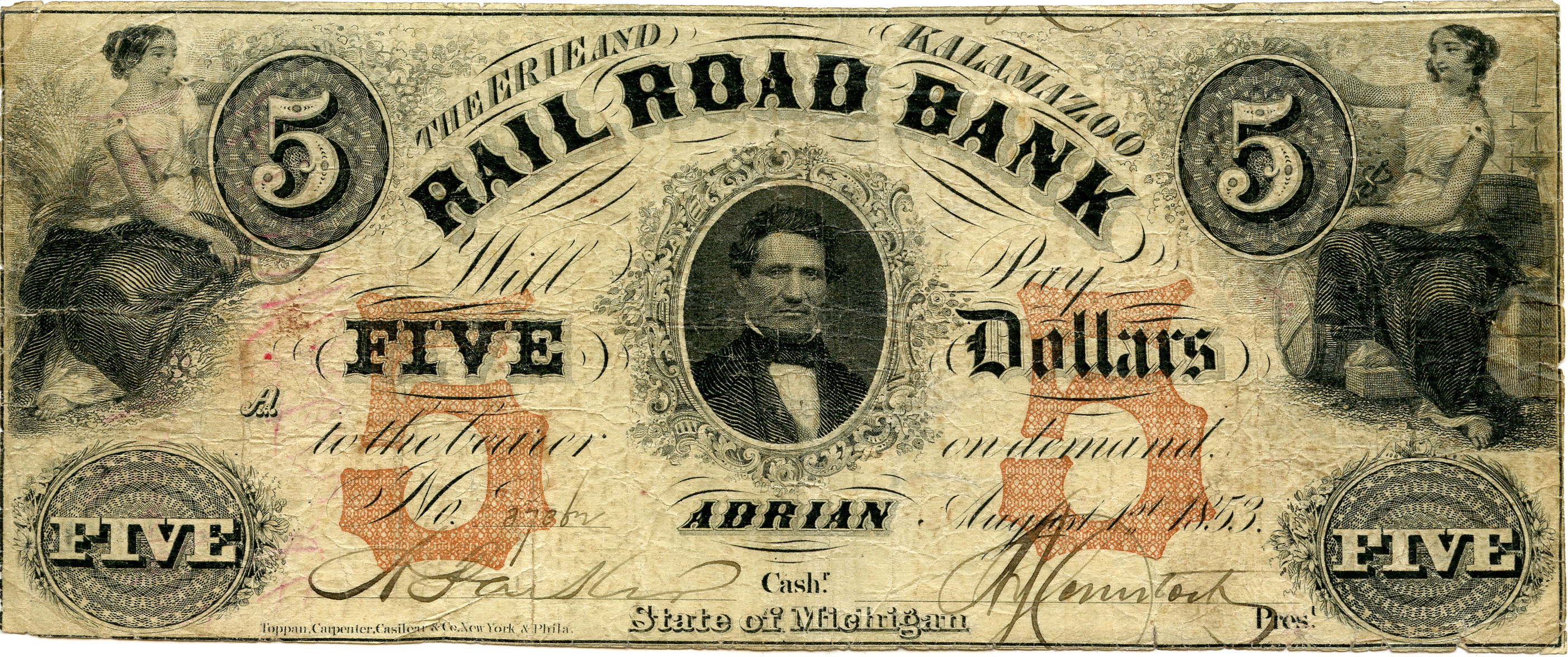
A note issued by the banking arm of the Erie & Kalamazoo Railroad

The Free Banking Era coincided with the first phase of railroad speculation. Not only did banks sponsor railroads, but railroad companies also entered the banking business to finance their expenses. Although railroads were indeed built, spectacular failures occurred. The Ohio Railroad company, established in 1835 to build along the coast of Lake Erie, immediately used a permissive clause in its charter to begin issuing credit notes, which it redeemed from its state funding. The company's failure left several hundred thousand dollars in worthless currency and an unusable track built upon wooden pilings. Similar episodes played out in southern states, where railroads received explicit authority to operate as banks. An 1830s railroad boom in Mississippi covered the state with speculative routes and railroad bank paper. Robert Y. Hayne organized the South Western Railroad Bank to finance interstate routes from South Carolina to Ohio, with stringent rules to protect its capital, but it ultimately had to suspend payments on its notes when the railroad ran out of funding. One of these institutions, the Georgia Railroad and Banking Company, survived the Free Banking Era, the Civil War and subsequent upheavals, ultimately merging with First Union in 1986.

== Late period ==
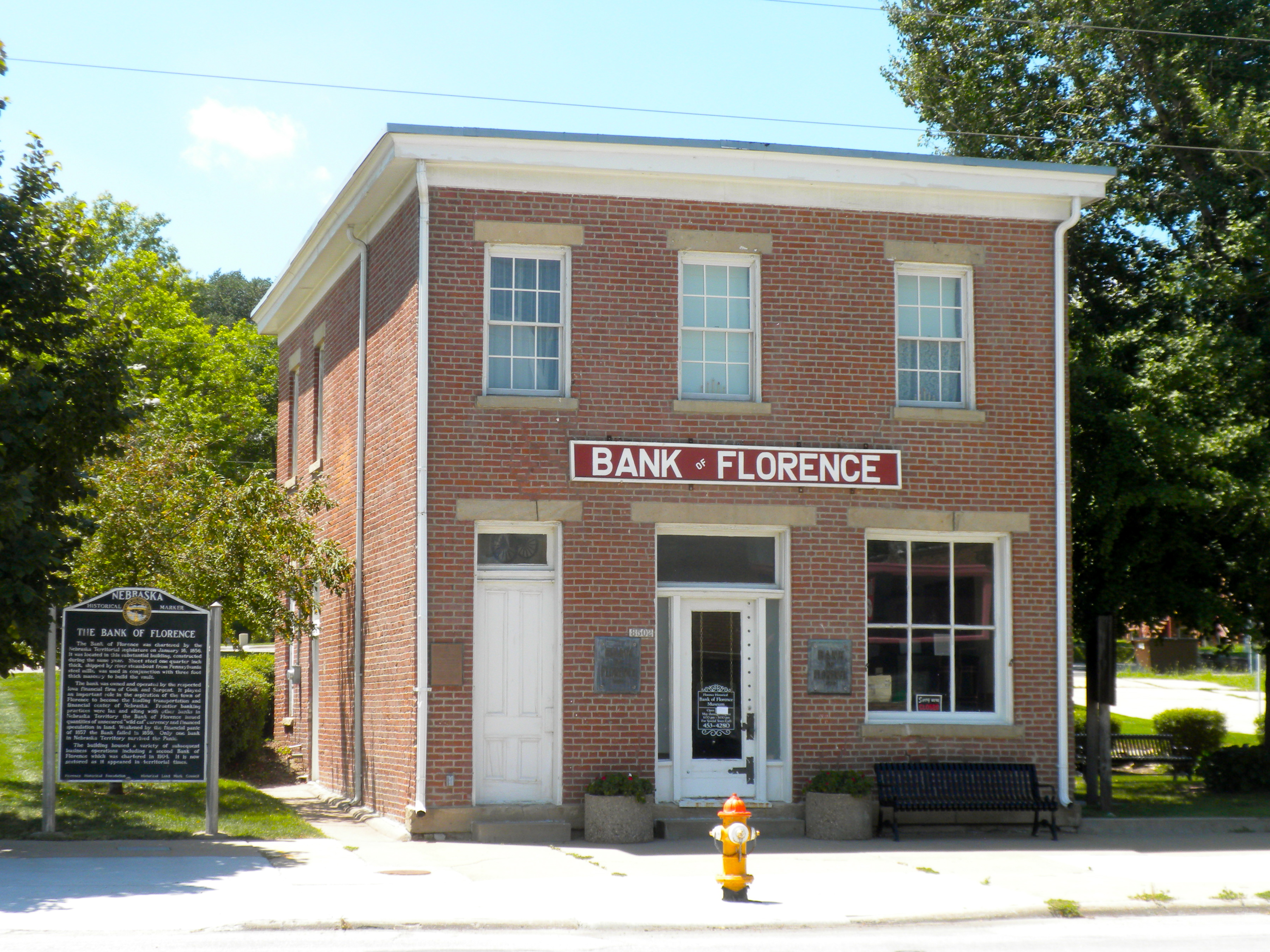
The Bank of Florence in present-day Omaha

The 1850s saw a new wave of free banking laws and outbreaks of wildcat banking in Tennessee, Indiana, Wisconsin and the Nebraska Territory. The laws of Indiana and Wisconsin allowed bankers to start business with minimal capital and accepted discounted state bonds at their face value as a security deposit. A "banker" might even pay for the discounted bonds with the same notes that they backed, draw the interest on the bonds, and circulate the surplus notes as he chose. Nebraska declared bank issues a crime in its first legislative session of 1855, but the following year it granted several banking charters, including that of the Bank of Florence. The third year, a new criminal code omitted the banking provision, allowing banks to organize under general business law. The Panic of 1857 wiped out all of the territory's banks, and only one paid all of its notes.

In 1863 the federal government passed a National Bank Act that created a national currency based on federal debt. This was not another centralized system. Local private banks issued the new currency, but under uniform rules that prevented confusion about the value of each bank's notes. A heavy tax on the former state bank notes removed them from circulation, bringing the wildcat phenomenon to an end.

== In popular culture ==
Mark Twain references unreliable wildcat money in chapter 8 of his 1894 novel Pudd'nhead Wilson. In Vilhelm Moberg's 1956/1961 novel The Settlers and in its 1972 film version The New Land, the character Robert is tricked to exchange silver and gold coins that he has earned in the California gold rush for worthless wildcat notes.
