= Specie Circular =

U.S. presidential executive order

The Specie Circular is a United States presidential executive order issued by President Andrew Jackson on July 11, 1836, pursuant to the Coinage Act of 1834. It required payment for government land to be in gold and silver (specie). It was repealed by a joint act of Congress on May 21, 1838.

== History ==
The Specie Circular was a reaction to the growing concerns about excessive speculations of land after the Indian removal, which was mostly done with soft currency. The sale of public lands increased five times between 1834 and 1836. Speculators paid for these purchases with depreciating paper money. While government law already demanded that land purchases be completed with specie or paper notes from specie-backed banks, a large portion of buyers used paper money from state banks not backed by hard money as a consequence of Jackson's veto of the rechartering of the Second Bank of the United States.

== Executive order ==
On July 11, 1836, Jackson ordered Secretary of the Treasury Levi Woodbury to issue the Specie Circular under federal law whereby the government refused to take anything but gold and silver specie for sales of public lands of over 320 acres after August 15, 1836. It did make a special exception to accept certain types of Virginia scrip. The executive order allowed legitimate settlers (non-speculators, or those purchasing plots of 320 acres or less) to use paper until December 15, 1836.

== Consequences ==
Because the order was one of Jackson's last acts in office, most of its consequences occurred during and were attributed to the presidency of Martin Van Buren. The devaluation of paper currency only increased with Jackson's proclamation. This sent inflation and prices upwards. Many at the time (and historians subsequently) blamed the Specie Circular for the rise in prices and the following Panic of 1837. Cries of "Rescind the circular!" went up and former President Jackson sent word to Van Buren asking him not to rescind the order. Jackson believed that it had to be given enough time to work. Lobbying efforts, especially by bankers, increased in Washington in an attempt to revoke the Specie Circular. Others, like Nicholas Biddle, believed that Jackson's defeat of the Second Bank of the United States was directly responsible for the irresponsible creation of paper money by the state banks which had precipitated this crisis.

The restrictions on credit caused by the order resulted in numerous bankruptcies and the failure of smaller banks. In the South the resulting recession drove down cotton prices well into the 1840s. Small farmers who had bought land on credit were unable to meet their loan repayments with their income from staple crops cut by a half. When they defaulted, "[t]heir land and slaves were repossessed and sold at auction, usually to already well-established slaveholders. ... Some farmers were able to keep a few acres and eke out a living as lesser yeomen. But many lost everything and fell into tenancy and sharecropping. When the cotton market finally recovered, affluent slaveholders held nearly all the South’s best land."

=== Democratic split ===
The Democratic party split in two ways regarding the order. Some, like Thomas Hart Benton, supported the use of sound money. The Locofoco wing of the party also agreed with Benton. Senators Nathaniel P. Tallmadge and William C. Rives supported the other side of the party, in favor of paper money. Senator John Pendleton King of Georgia blamed Jackson for the effects of the circular (among other policies), stating in an 1837 speech that he "had not the slightest doubt that our present difficulties were owing entirely to the unfortunate policy and violent measures of the Executive for several years past. This was the only cause, and this was abundantly sufficient." In the United States House of Representatives, John Bell even challenged his own party member, James K. Polk, for his position as Speaker of the House of Representatives over the issue.

== See also ==
- Specie Payment Resumption Act (1875)
- Executive orders
