= Independent Treasury =

System for managing the US money supply

The Independent Treasury was the system for managing the money supply of the United States federal government through the U.S. Treasury and its sub-treasuries, independently of the national banking and financial systems. It was created on August 6, 1846, by the 29th Congress, with the enactment of the Independent Treasury Act of 1846 (ch. 90, 9 Stat. 59). It was expanded with the creation of the national banking system in 1863. It functioned until the early 20th century, when the Federal Reserve System replaced it. During this time, the Treasury took over an ever-larger number of functions of a central bank and the U.S. Treasury Department came to be the major force in the U.S. money market.

== Background ==
The Panic of 1819 unleashed a wave of popular resentment against the Second Bank of the United States (the "national bank"), which, under profitable private ownership, handled various fiscal duties for the U.S. government after its establishment in 1816; in particular, like the first Bank of the United States, its charter granted its private ownership a monopoly over receiving and holding deposits of the Treasury's public funds. In addition to holding all government funds, the bank also made loans and acted as a regulator of other banks by periodically presenting banknotes for redemption. In particular, under the practice of fractional banking, it used these public funds to back issues of credit (loans) several times larger than the funds ostensibly "backing" them. (Note: During the 19th century, the U.S. government minted coins, but did not issue paper banknotes. Banks, including the national bank, issued their own paper banknotes, which could be presented to those banks for redemption in coins.) In 1829, a group of influential Philadelphians, including William Duane, editor William M. Gouge, and members of the Working Men's Party, presented an influential report claiming that banks "laid the foundation of artificial inequality of wealth, and, thereby, artificial inequality of power" by depositing public funds in private banks where its use as backing of loan credit benefited the small number of bank owners (rather than the public at large) and placed discretion over the use of this credit in the hands of these private interests. In 1833, Gouge published A Short History of Paper Money and Banking in the United States, which became an influential work among hard money advocates. Gouge and others who favored hard money policies held that these privately owned banks had a tendency to issue too many bank notes, thereby triggering speculative booms and contributing to inequality when crashes precipitated foreclosures and bankruptcies leaving assets in the hands of investors.

Gouge and Condy Raguet proposed the creation of an independent treasury system, whereby the federal government would store its funds as specie in government-controlled vaults, rather than relying on the national bank's private monopoly. During his second term, President Andrew Jackson removed federal deposits from the national bank and shifted them to state-chartered banks that became known as "pet banks". The Jackson administration also banned the pet banks from issuing banknotes of denominations of less than $20. The federal charter of the national bank had expired by the end of Jackson's second term, but many hard money advocates still favored the removal of all federal deposits from all private banks.

== Establishment ==
=== First establishment ===
Independent Treasury Act of 1840
- Long title: An Act to provide for the collection, safekeeping, transfer, and disbursement, of the public revenue.
- Enacted by: the 26th United States Congress
- Effective: July 4, 1840

Legislative history
- Introduced in the Senate; Passed the Senate on January 23, 1840 (24–18); Passed the House on June 30, 1840 (124-107); Signed into law by President Martin Van Buren on July 4, 1840

Major amendments
- Repealed by John Tyler on August 13, 1841, after passing the House on August 9, 1841 (134–87) and the Senate on June 9, 1841 (29–18).

Two months into the presidency of Martin Van Buren, on May 10, 1837, some state banks in New York, running out of hard currency reserves, suddenly refused to convert paper money into gold or silver. Other financial institutions throughout the nation quickly followed suit. This financial crisis, the Panic of 1837, was followed by a five-year depression in which banks failed and unemployment reached record highs. Many observers then and later -- notably Senator Thomas Hart Benton is his memoir, Thirty Years View, contended that this panic was deliberately precipitated by interests involved with the Second National Bank to force renewal of its charter.

To deal with the crisis, Van Buren proposed the establishment of an independent U.S. treasury. Such a system would, he asserted, take the politics out of the nation's money supply: the government would hold all of its money balances in the form of gold or silver and would be restricted from printing paper money at will, a measure designed to prevent inflation. Van Buren announced his proposal in September 1837; but that was too much for state banking interests, and an alliance of conservative Democrats and Whigs prevented it from becoming law until 1840, when the 26th Congress passed the Independent Treasury Act of 1840 (ch. 41, 5 Stat. 385). Although signed into law on July 4, 1840, it lasted only one year; for the Whigs, who won a congressional majority and the presidency in the 1840 elections, promptly repealed the law.

=== Re-establishment ===
Independent Treasury Act of 1846
- Long title: An Act to provide for the better organization of the treasury, and for the collection, safekeeping, transfer, and disbursement of the public revenue. Whereas, by the fourth section of the act entitled "Act to establish the Treasury Department," approve.
- Enacted by: the 29th United States Congress
- Effective: August 6, 1846

Legislative history
- Introduced in the House; Passed the House on April 2, 1846 (123-67); Passed the Senate on August 1, 1846 (28–25); Signed into law by President James K. Polk on August 6, 1846

The Democrats took back their congressional majority and the presidency in the 1844 elections, re-establishing the dominant position the party had lost four years earlier. President James K. Polk made the revival of the independent treasury and a reduction of the tariff the two pillars of his domestic economic program, and pushed both through Congress. He signed the Independent Treasury Act on August 6, 1846, one week after signing the Walker tariff.

The 1846 act provided that the public revenues be retained in the Treasury building and in sub-treasuries in various cities. The Treasury was to pay out its own funds and be completely independent of the private banks of the nation. All payments by and to the government were to be made in either specie or Treasury Notes, issued by the Treasury itself, backed by its specie holdings and the credit of the Republic. The separation of the Treasury from the banking system was never completed, however; the Treasury's operations continued to influence the money market, as specie payments to and from the government affected the amount of hard money in circulation.

== History ==
=== Antebellum Years ===
Although the Independent Treasury did restrict the expansion of credit, it also posed a new set of economic problems. In periods of prosperity, revenue surpluses accumulated in the Treasury, reducing hard money circulation, tightening credit, and restraining inflation of trade and production. In periods of depression and panic, when banks suspended specie payments and hard money was hoarded, the government's insistence on being paid in specie tended to aggravate economic difficulties by limiting the amount of specie available for private credit.

In 1857, another panic hit the money market. However, whereas the failure of banks during the Panic of 1837 caused the government great embarrassment, bank failures during the Panic of 1857 did not, as the government, having its money in its own hands, was able to pay its debts, and met every liability without trouble. In his December 7, 1857 State of the Union message, President James Buchanan said:

Thanks to the independent treasury, the government has not suspended [specie] payments, as it was compelled to do by the failure of the banks in 1837. It will continue to discharge its liabilities to the people in gold and silver. Its disbursements in coin pass into circulation and materially assist in restoring a sound currency.

=== Civil War Modifications ===
In order to prosecute the Civil War, Congress passed the acts of 1863 and 1864 creating national banks. Exceptions were made to the prohibition against depositing government funds in private banks, and in certain cases payments to the government could be made in national bank notes. The Treasury also issued currency backed by public credit, Lincoln's so-called Greenbacks.

=== Post-Civil War Years ===
After the Civil War, the independent Treasury continued in modified form, as each successive administration tried to cope with its weaknesses in various ways. Secretary of the Treasury Leslie M. Shaw (1902–1907) made many innovations; he attempted to use Treasury funds to expand and contract the money supply according to the nation's credit needs. Nonetheless, during this period the United States experienced several economic panics of varying severity. Economists Charles Calomiris and Gary Gorton rate the worst panics as those leading to widespread bank suspensions—the panics of 1873, 1893, and 1907, and a suspension in 1914. Over-expansion of credit by private banking was a fundamental cause of all these panics. Widespread suspensions were forestalled through coordinated actions during both the 1884 and the 1890 panics. A bank crisis in 1896, in which there was a perceived need for coordination, is also sometimes classified as a panic.

=== Federal Reserve System Replacement ===
When the Panic of 1907 once again highlighted the inability of the system to stabilize the money market, Congress established the National Monetary Commission to investigate the panic and to propose legislation to regulate banking. The commission's work culminated in the Federal Reserve Act of 1913, and the demise of the Independent Treasury System. As a result, the Federal Reserve Act established the current U.S. Federal Reserve System and authorized the printing of Federal Reserve Notes (now commonly known as the U.S. Dollar). Government funds were gradually transferred from subtreasuries to the Federal Reserve, and a 1920 act of the 66th Congress (The Independent Treasury Act of 1920) mandated the closing of the last subtreasuries in the following year, thus bringing the system to an end and insuring the monopoly of the privately owned Federal Reserve.
