= Presidency of Martin Van Buren =

U.S. presidential administration from 1837 to 1841

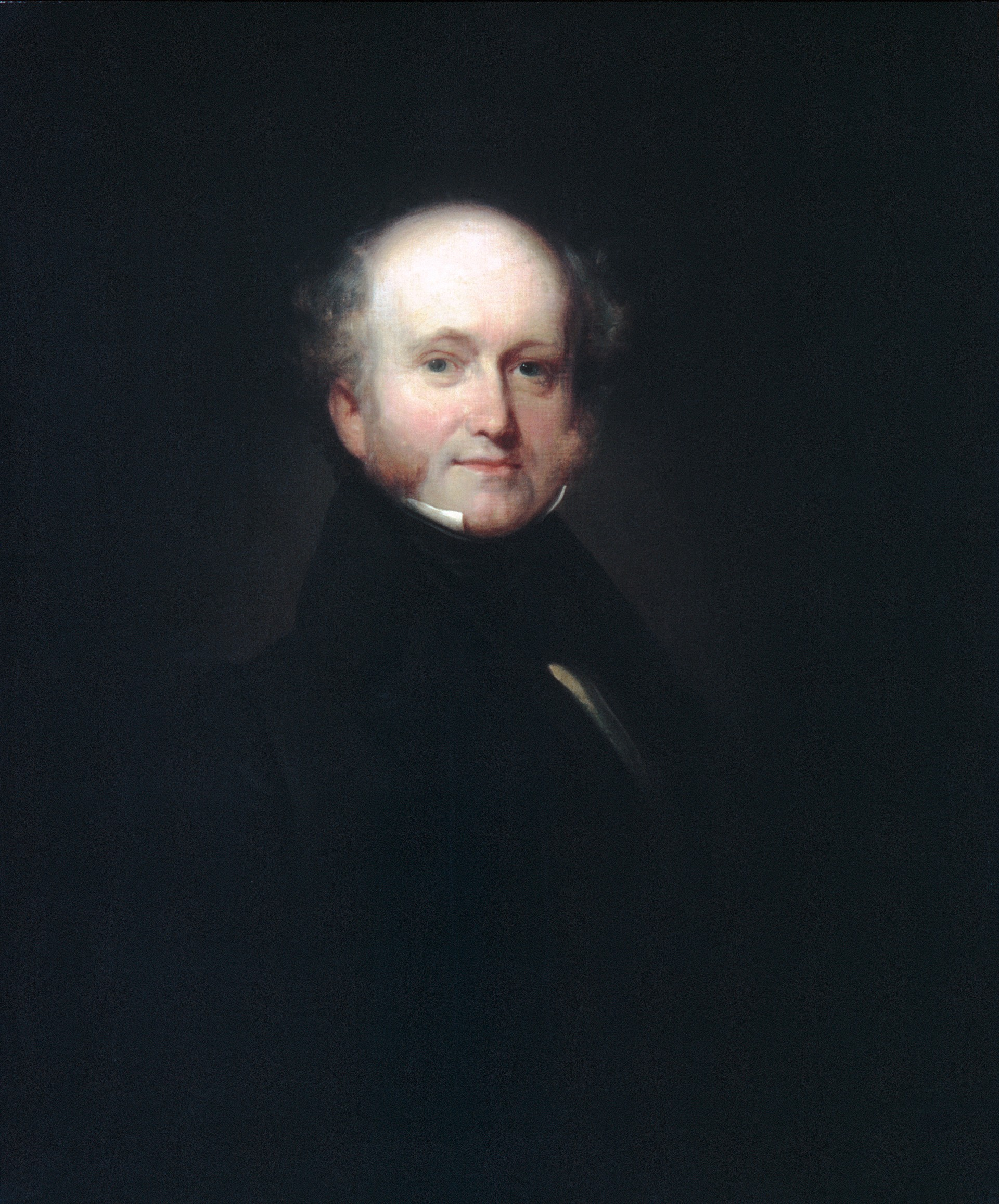
- Portrait, c. 1837–1838
- Presidency of Martin Van Buren; March 4, 1837 – March 4, 1841
- Vice President: Richard Mentor Johnson
- Cabinet: See list
- Party: Democratic
- Election: 1836
- Seat: White House
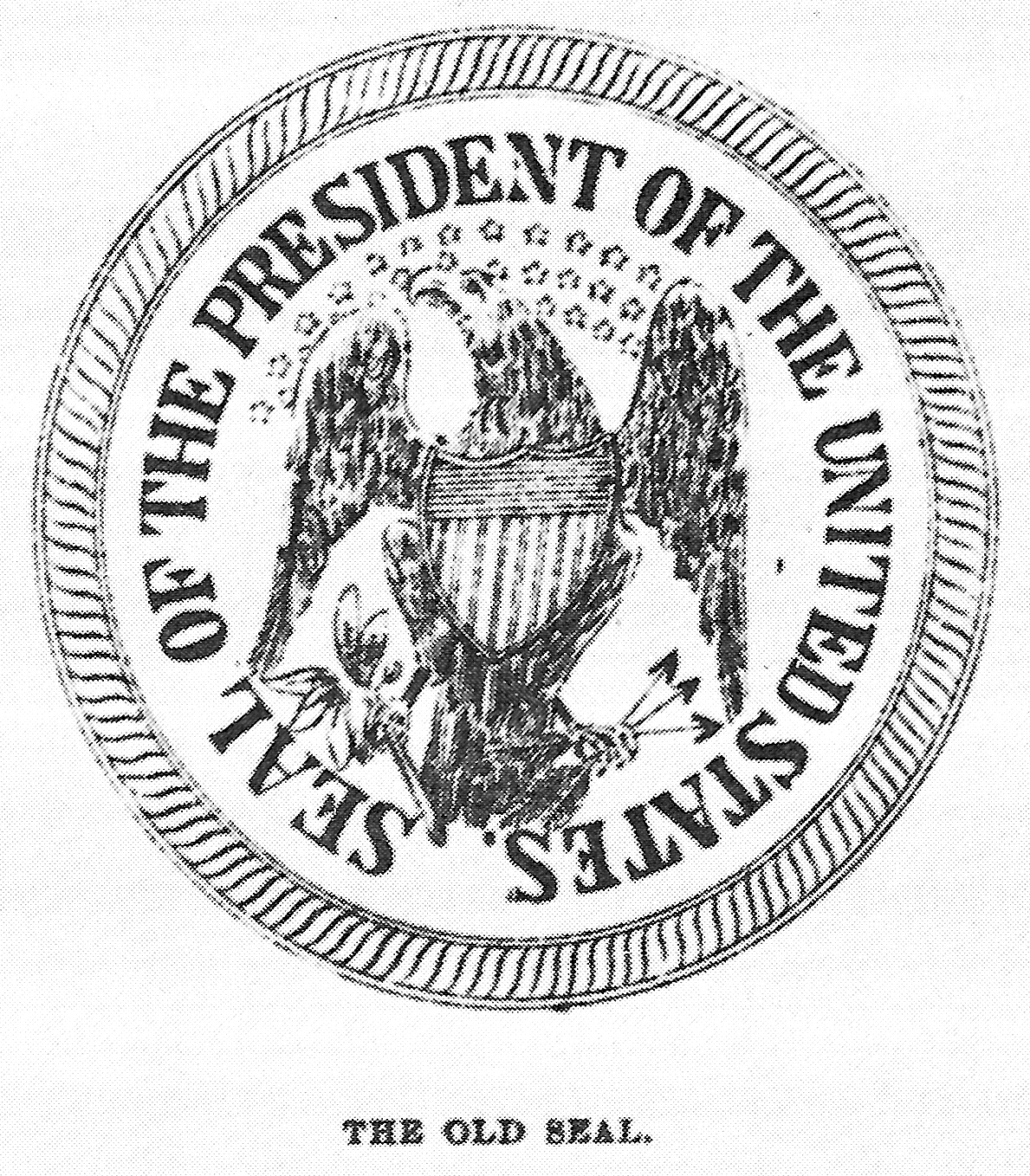
- Seal of the president (1840–1850)

Martin Van Buren's tenure as the eighth president of the United States began on March 4, 1837, and ended on March 4, 1841. Van Buren, a Democrat and vice president under Andrew Jackson, took office after defeating multiple Whig Party candidates in the 1836 presidential election. Van Buren's presidency ended following his defeat by Whig candidate William Henry Harrison in the 1840 presidential election.

The central issue facing President Van Buren was the Panic of 1837, a sustained economic downturn that began just weeks into his presidency. Van Buren opposed any direct federal government intervention and cut back federal spending to maintain a balanced budget. He also presided over the establishment of the independent treasury system, a series of government vaults that replaced banks as the repository of federal funds. Van Buren continued the Indian removal policies of the Jackson administration, as thousands of Native Americans were resettled west of the Mississippi River during his presidency. He sought to avoid major tensions over slavery, rejecting the possibility of annexing Texas and appealing the case of United States v. The Amistad to the Supreme Court. In foreign affairs, Van Buren avoided war with Britain despite several incidents, including the bloodless Aroostook War and the Caroline Affair.

Van Buren's inability to deal effectively with the economic depression, combined with the growing political strength of the opposition Whigs, led to his defeat in the 1840 presidential election. His presidency was marked as much by failure and criticism as by success and popular acclaim, and is often ranked as average or below-average by historians. His most lasting achievement was as a political organizer who built the modern Democratic Party and guided it to dominance in the new Second Party System.

== Presidential election of 1836 ==
Van Buren had emerged as President Andrew Jackson's preferred successor during the Petticoat affair, and Van Buren won election as vice president in 1832. The two men –charismatic "Old Hickory" and the super-efficient "Sly Fox"—had entirely different personalities but had become an effective team in eight years in office together. Jackson declined to seek another term in the 1836 presidential election, but he remained influential within the Democratic Party, and he strongly supported Van Buren's candidacy in the 1836 election. With Jackson's support, Van Buren won the presidential nomination of the 1835 Democratic National Convention without opposition. Two names were put forward for the vice-presidential nomination: Representative Richard M. Johnson of Kentucky, and former senator William Cabell Rives of Virginia. Though most Southern Democrats favored Rives, Jackson preferred Johnson, and his influence helped lead to Johnson's nomination for the vice presidency.

1836 electoral vote results

The newly established Whig Party, a loose coalition bound by mutual opposition to Jackson, sought to prevent Van Buren's victory in the election of 1836. Lacking the party unity or organizational strength to field a single ticket or define a single platform, the Whigs fielded multiple candidates in the hope of forcing a contingent election in the House of Representatives. Senator Hugh Lawson White of Tennessee, a former Jackson ally, emerged as the major Whig candidate in the South, touting himself as the only Southerner in the race. William Henry Harrison, who had gained notoriety for his service in the Battle of Tippecanoe, edged out Senator Daniel Webster to become the main Whig candidate in the North. The Whig Party campaigned on denouncing Jackson's alleged executive tyranny, and attacked Van Buren as an untrustworthy career politician.

Van Buren had to articulate a position on slavery that could win full-throated approval in both the pro-slavery South and the Northern states where slavery was illegal and unpopular. The biggest challenge came in the South, where all Yankees were automatically suspect on the slave question. Van Buren moved to obtain the support of Southerners by assuring them that he opposed abolitionism and supported the continued existence of slavery in states where it was present. Van Buren did not discuss his own personal beliefs, which held that slavery was immoral, but was sanctioned by the Constitution. Van Buren's strategy was not to defend his personal position, but to attack abolitionists, who were popular nowhere in the United States. As vice president, he cast the tie-breaking Senate vote in favor of a bill to subject abolitionist mail to state laws, thus ensuring that abolitionist mail would not be circulated in the South. While Southern Whigs cast doubt on his devotion to slavery, his supporters insisted he believed in three things: that Congress could not interfere with slavery in the states, that it would be "impolitic" to abolish slavery in the District of Columbia, and that agitation about slavery endangered the union. Van Buren and his supporters realized that to build a viable national party and to maintain the union they had to compromise by accepting slavery. The Democrats created the first modern party, but in doing so consciously removed slavery and abolition from the partisan agenda. More than a decade later, in 1848, Van Buren would become a leading opponent of the extension of slavery in the North while running with the Free Soil Party, but by then he had abandoned any hope of Southern support.

Van Buren won the 1836 election with 764,198 popular votes, 50.9 percent of the total, and 170 electoral votes. Harrison led the Whigs with 73 electoral votes, White receiving 26, and Webster 14. Willie Person Mangum received South Carolina's 11 electoral votes, which were awarded by the state legislature. Compared to Jackson's 1832 campaign, Van Buren performed better in New England but worse in the South and West. Van Buren's victory resulted from a combination of his own attractive political and personal qualities, Jackson's popularity and endorsement, the organizational power of the Democratic party, and the inability of the Whig Party to muster an effective candidate and campaign. Virginia's presidential electors voted for Van Buren for president but William Smith for vice president, leaving Johnson one electoral vote short of election. In accordance with the Twelfth Amendment, the Senate elected Johnson vice president in a contingent vote. Meanwhile, in the concurrent congressional elections, Democrats retained control of both houses of Congress.

The election of 1836 marked an important turning point in American political history because of the part it played in establishing the Second Party System. In the early 1830s the political party structure was still changing rapidly, and factional and personal leaders continued to play a major role in politics. By the end of the campaign of 1836, the new party system was almost fully formed, as nearly every faction had been absorbed by either the Democrats or the Whigs.

== Inauguration ==
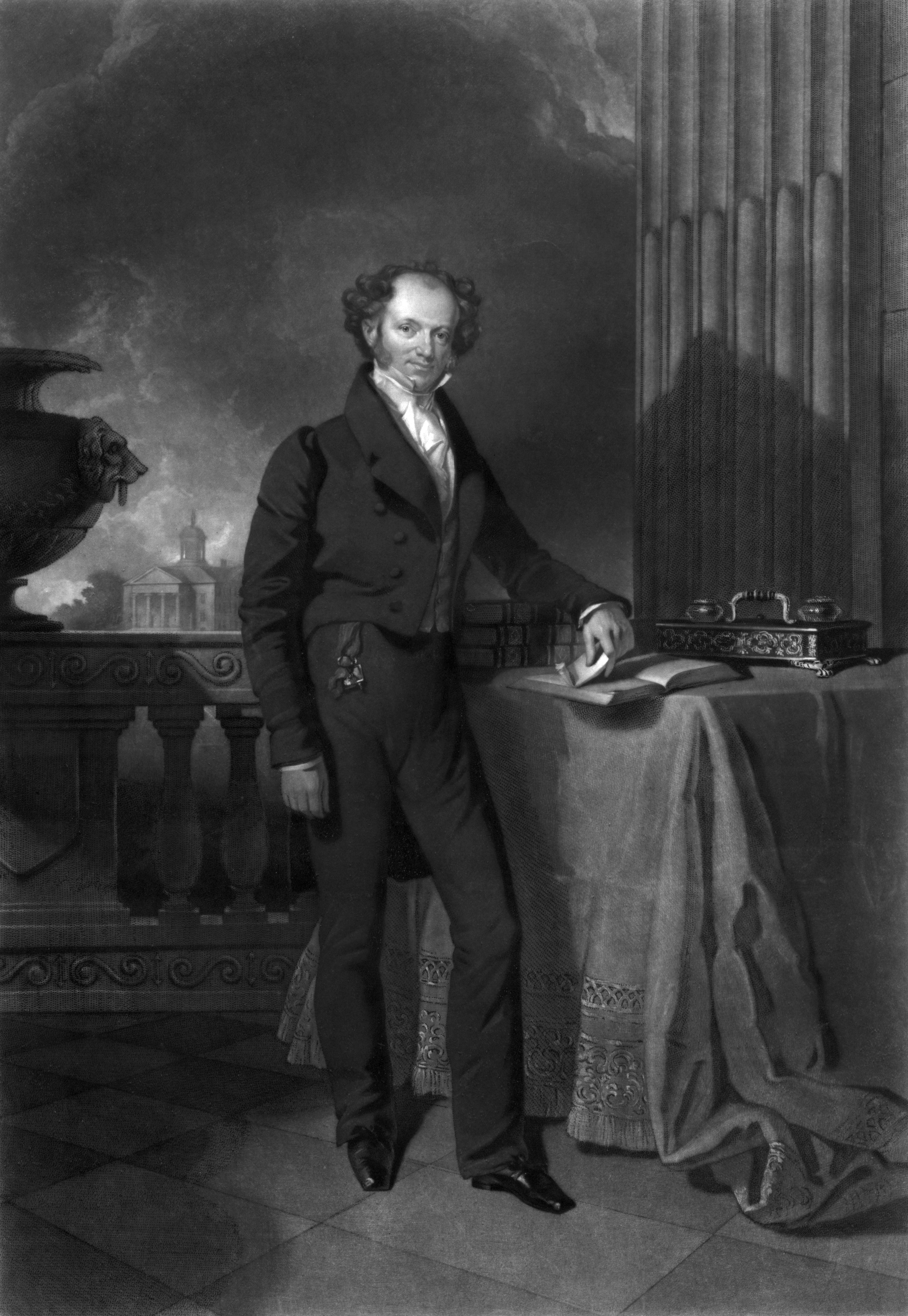
Portrait of Martin Van Buren

Van Buren was sworn in as president by Supreme Court Chief Justice Roger Taney on March 4, 1837, in a ceremony held on the East Portico of the United States Capitol. At age 54, he was the youngest person at the time to assume the presidency. Taking the oath as the eighth president, Van Buren defined his role as one of preservation: "sacredly to uphold those political institutions" created by the Founders and especially to safeguard the hallowed Jeffersonian principles of a limited national government and the liberty and sovereignty of "the people and the states."

The inauguration marked the departure of a vital personality–Jackson–and the arrival of his chosen successor–Van Buren–in a new presidential dynasty. They rode together in a small phaeton (built from the wood of USS Constitution) drawn by four gray horses. This was the first time that the outgoing president and incoming president rode together to the Capitol. The day's festivities proved less a celebration of the incoming president than a tribute to the outgoing one. Van Buren's inaugural address took wistful note of it:

In receiving from the people the sacred trust twice confided to my illustrious predecessor, and which he has discharged so faithfully and so well, I know that I can not expect to perform the arduous task with equal ability and success. But...I may hope that somewhat of the same cheering approbation will be found to attend upon my path.

The inaugural ball was held in the evening at Carusi's Saloon, which was the tradition of the time.

== Cabinet ==
Van Buren cabinet
Office	Name	Term
President	Martin Van Buren	1837–1841
Vice President	Richard Mentor Johnson	1837–1841
Secretary of State	John Forsyth	1837–1841
Secretary of the Treasury	Levi Woodbury	1837–1841
Secretary of War	Joel Roberts Poinsett	1837–1841
Attorney General	Benjamin Franklin Butler	1837–1838
Felix Grundy	1838–1839
Henry D. Gilpin	1840–1841
Postmaster General	Amos Kendall	1837–1840
John Milton Niles	1840–1841
Secretary of the Navy	Mahlon Dickerson	1837–1838
James Kirke Paulding	1838–1841

Van Buren retained much of Jackson's cabinet and lower-level appointees, as he hoped that the retention of Jackson's appointees would halt Whig momentum in the South and restore confidence in the Democrats as a party of sectional unity. The cabinet holdovers represented the different regions of the country: Secretary of the Treasury Levi Woodbury came from New England, Attorney General Benjamin Franklin Butler and Secretary of the Navy Mahlon Dickerson hailed from the mid-Atlantic states, Secretary of State John Forsyth represented the South, and Postmaster General Amos Kendall of Kentucky represented the West. For the position of Secretary of War, the lone unfilled post in the cabinet, Van Buren first approached William Cabell Rives, who had sought the vice presidency in 1836. After Rives declined to join the cabinet, Van Buren appointed Joel Roberts Poinsett, a South Carolinian who had opposed secession during the Nullification Crisis.

Van Buren's cabinet choices were criticized by Pennsylvanians such as James Buchanan, who argued that their state deserved a cabinet position, as well as some Democrats who argued that Van Buren should have used his patronage powers to augment his own power. But Van Buren saw value in avoiding contentious patronage battles, and his decision to retain Jackson's cabinet made it clear that he intended to continue the policies of his predecessor. Additionally, Van Buren had helped select Jackson's cabinet appointees and enjoyed strong working relationships with them.

Dissatisfied with the discipline and morale of the navy, Van Buren pressured Dickerson to resign in 1838, and Dickerson was succeeded by James K. Paulding. That same year, Butler resigned and was replaced with Felix Grundy, a Senator from Tennessee with close ties to Jackson. Grundy was later succeeded by Henry D. Gilpin of Pennsylvania. John M. Niles, a party loyalist and former Senator from Connecticut, became Postmaster General in 1840.

Van Buren was closely involved in foreign affairs and matters pertaining to the Treasury Department, but the Post Office, War Department, and Navy Department all possessed high levels of autonomy under their respective cabinet secretaries. Van Buren held regular formal cabinet meetings and discontinued the informal gatherings of advisers that had attracted so much attention during Jackson's presidency. Van Buren saw himself as "a mediator, and to some extent an umpire between the conflicting opinions" of his counselors. He solicited advice from department heads, tolerating open and even frank exchanges between cabinet members. The president's detachment allowed him to reserve judgment and protect his own prerogative for making final decisions.

=== White House hostess ===
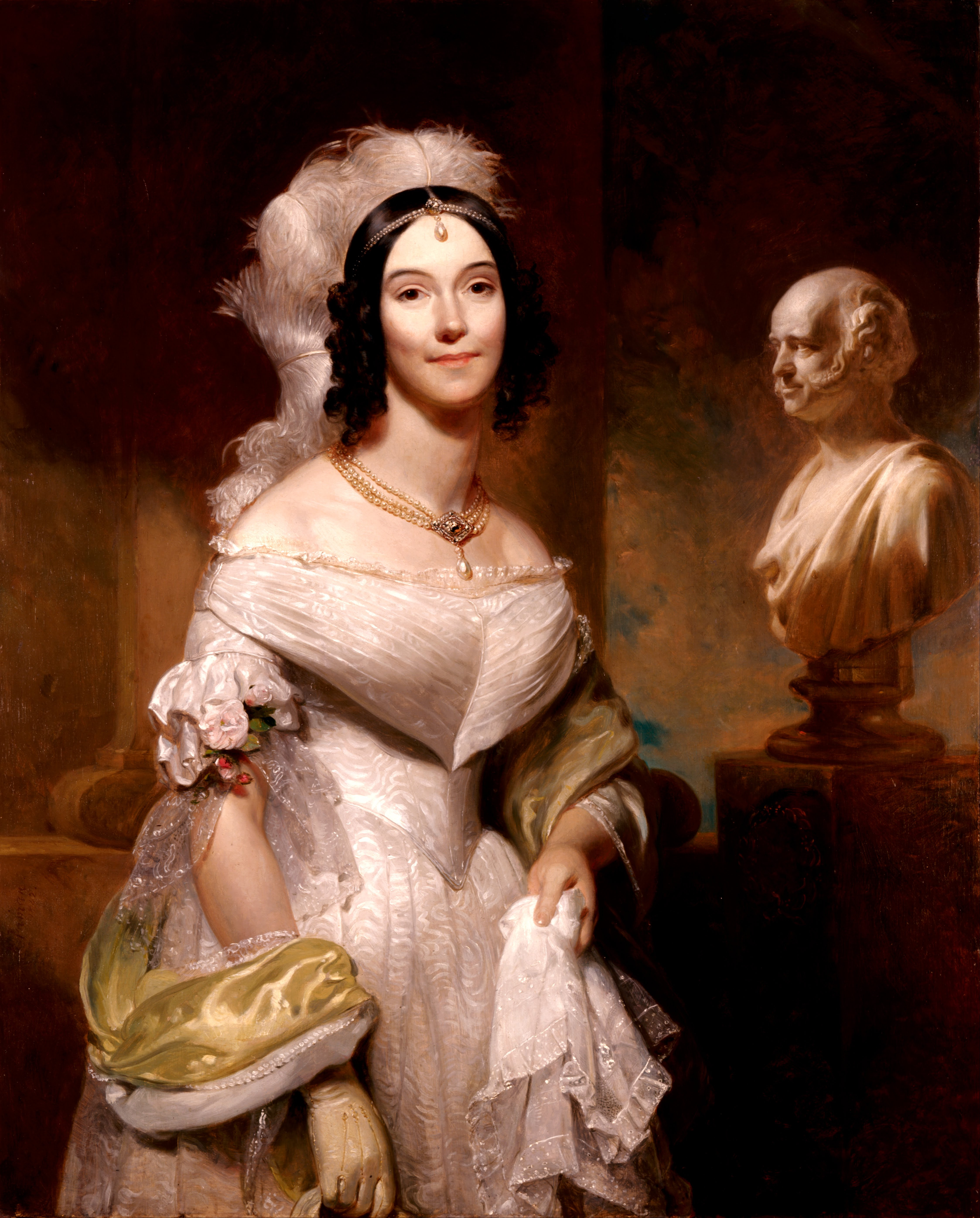
White House hostess Angelica Singleton. Portrait of Angelica Singleton Van Buren by Henry Inman, 1842

For the first half of his presidency, Van Buren, who had been a widower since the death of his wife, Hannah Van Buren in 1819, did not have a specific person fill the role of White House hostess, instead assuming such duties himself. When his eldest son Abraham Van Buren married Angelica Singleton in 1838, the president quickly acted to install his daughter-in-law as his hostess. She solicited the advice of her distant relative, Dolley Madison, who had moved back to Washington after her husband's death, and soon the president's parties livened up. After the 1839 New Year's Eve reception, the Boston Post raved: "[Angelica Van Buren is a] lady of rare accomplishments, very modest yet perfectly easy and graceful in her manners and free and vivacious in her conversation ... universally admired." As the nation endured a deep economic depression, newspaper coverage of Angelica Van Buren's receiving style at receptions, influenced by her heavy reading on European court life, as well as the anecdotal claim that she intended to re-landscape the White House grounds to resemble the royal gardens of Europe, were used to attack her father-in-law. Pennsylvania Whig Congressman Charles Ogle referred obliquely to her as part of the presidential "household" in his famous "Gold Spoon Oration."

== Judicial appointments ==
Van Buren appointed two associate justices of the Supreme Court. Congress had added two new seats on the Supreme Court with the Eighth and Ninth Circuits Act of 1837, but President Jackson had filled only one of those positions. To fill the vacancy, in early 1837 Van Buren appointed Senator John McKinley of Alabama, a key supporter of Van Buren's 1836 presidential campaign. A second Supreme Court vacancy arose in 1841 due to the death of Philip P. Barbour. Van Buren appointed federal judge Peter Vivian Daniel to succeed Barbour. Van Buren also appointed eight other federal judges, all to United States district courts.

== Domestic affairs ==
=== Panic of 1837 and treasury system ===
==== Panic of 1837 ====
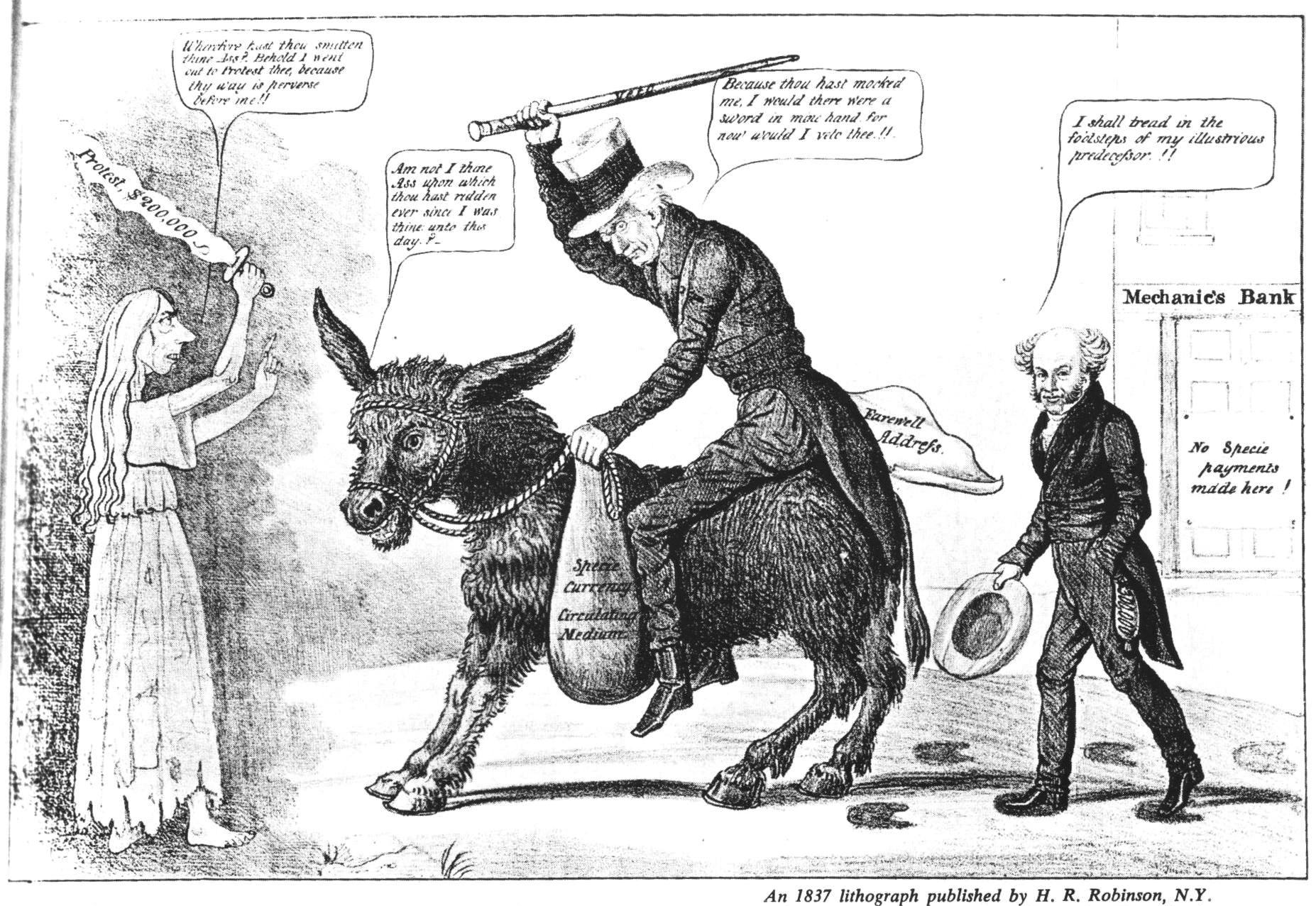
The Modern Balaam and His Ass, an 1837 caricature placing the blame for the Panic of 1837 and the perilous state of the banking system on outgoing President Andrew Jackson, shown riding a donkey, while President Martin Van Buren comments approvingly.

On May 10, 1837, some important state banks in New York, running out of hard currency reserves, suddenly refused to convert paper money into gold or silver. Other financial institutions throughout the nation quickly followed suit, marking the start of a financial crisis that would become known as the Panic of 1837. The panic was followed by a five-year depression in which numerous banks failed and unemployment reached record highs.

Van Buren blamed the economic collapse on greedy business and financial institutions, as well as on the over extension of credit by U.S. banks. Whig leaders in Congress, meanwhile, blamed Democratic economic policies, especially the 1836 Specie Circular. That policy had required the use of specie (coins), rather than paper money, in the purchase of government-held lands, and had had the effect of transferring specie from Eastern banks to Western banks and undermining confidence in banknotes. Whigs also blamed Jackson's dismantling of the Second Bank of the United States, thereby allowing state banks to engage in lending and the printing of paper money without effective regulation. Another contributing factor to the panic was the sudden contraction of English credit, which had helped to finance a period of strong economic growth since 1830.

==== Independent Treasury ====
While Whig leader Henry Clay promoted his own American System as the best means for economic recovery, Van Buren's response to the panic focused on the practice of "strict economy and frugality." The potential repeal of the Specie Circular policy split the Democratic Party, with prominent Democrats like William Cabell Rives and Nathaniel Tallmadge urging it as part of a move away from Jackson's hard currency policies. After a long period of consideration, Van Buren announced in May 1837 that he would not revoke the Specie Circular. Van Buren feared that revoking the Specie Circular would hurt western banks, and was reluctant to depart from a Jacksonian policy so quickly after taking office.

Van Buren's decision to uphold the Specie Circular represented the first step in his commitment to the separation of the government from all banking operations, a policy that would become the central economic policy of his tenure. During Jackson's presidency, the federal government had moved its funds from the Second Bank of the United States to so-called "pet banks." Both the Second Bank of the United States and the pet banks had used those federal deposits to engage in regular banking activities, specifically the extension of loans. Van Buren sought to fully divorce the federal government from banking operations by establishing the Independent Treasury system, essentially a series of vaults, to hold government funds. The Independent Treasury took its name from its supposed independence from banks and British creditors, as British creditors had made large investments in the Second Bank of the United States. The Independent Treasury was inspired by the writings of William M. Gouge, a hard currency advocate who argued that any federal collaboration with banks both risked corruption and reinforced a speculative boom and bust cycle that led to economic downturns.

When the 25th Congress convened in September 1837, Van Buren introduced his legislation to create the Independent Treasury system. Van Buren's plan allowed the government to accept paper money as payment, but the government would seek to convert that paper money to specie as quickly as possible. State banking interests strongly opposed Van Buren's proposal, and an alliance of conservative Democrats and Whigs blocked the creation of the Independent Treasury System. As the debate over the Independent Treasury continued, Rives and some other Democrats defected to the Whig Party, which itself grew more unified in its opposition to Van Buren. The Panic of 1837 loomed large over the 1837 and 1838 election cycles, as the carryover effects of the economic downturn led to Whig gains in both the House of Representatives and the Senate. The Democratic Party retained a majority in both chambers after the elections, but a split among House Democrats led to the election of Whig Congressman Robert M. T. Hunter as Speaker of the House. Meanwhile, Whigs won gains in state elections across the country, including in Van Buren's home state of New York.

In early 1838, most banks ended their moratorium on converting paper into money into gold or silver, temporarily bringing an end to the monetary crisis. The economy began to recover, and an alliance of Democrats and Whigs repealed the Specie Circular that year. A second economic downturn, known as the Panic of 1839, began as the result of a cotton glut. With less income coming in from the cotton trade, land prices plummeted, industries laid off employees, and banks failed. According to historian Daniel Walker Howe, the economic crisis of the late 1830s and early 1840s was the most severe recession in U.S. history until the Great Depression. Partly in response to this second economic downturn, Congress enacted Van Buren's Independent Treasury proposal in June 1840. The Whigs would abolish the Independent Treasury system in 1841, but it was revived in 1846 and remained in place until the passage of the Federal Reserve Act in 1913.

==== Reduction in working hours ====
In 1840, President van Buren issued an executive order which lowered the working hours for government workers to only 10 hours per day. This mostly included laborers and mechanics.

=== Indian removal ===
Van Buren depicted in a diplomacy medal given to Native American representatives in the 19th century

Federal policy under Jackson had sought, through the Indian Removal Act of 1830, to move all indigenous peoples to lands west of the Mississippi River. Continuing this policy, the federal government negotiated 19 treaties with Indian nations in the course of Van Buren's presidency. By the time Van Buren took office, the Muscogee, Chickasaw, and Choctaw had been removed to lands west of the Mississippi River, but a large number of Cherokee were still in Georgia and the Seminole remained in Florida. An 1835 treaty signed by U.S. government officials and representatives of the Cherokee Nation had established terms under which the entire nation would cede its territory and move across the Mississippi River, but many Cherokee viewed the treaty as fraudulent. In 1838, Van Buren directed General Winfield Scott to forcibly move all those Cherokee who had not yet complied with the treaty. The Cherokee were herded violently into internment camps, where they were kept for the summer of 1838. The actual transportation west was delayed by intense heat and drought, but in the fall, the Cherokee reluctantly agreed to migrate west. During the Cherokee removal, part of the Trail of Tears, some 20,000 people were relocated against their will.

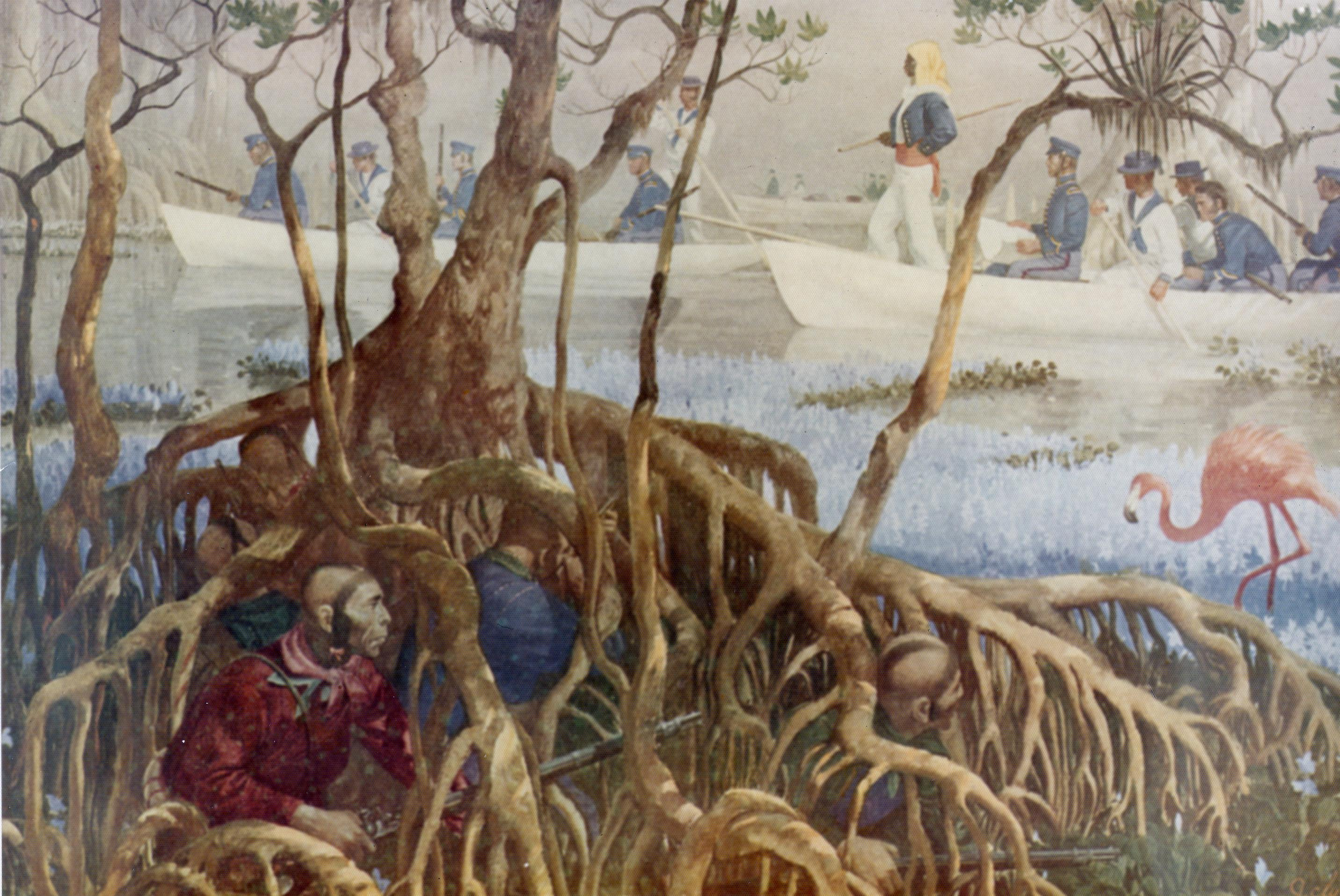
A U.S. Marine boat expedition searching the Everglades during the Second Seminole War

In the Florida Territory, the Seminole engaged the army in a prolonged conflict known as the Second Seminole War. The Seminole were more resistant to removal than other tribes of the South due in large part to the influence of hundreds of escaped slaves and other African Americans who lived among the Seminole. These escaped slaves feared that the departure of the Seminole would lead to their own re-enslavement. Prior to leaving office, Jackson had placed General Thomas Jesup in command of all U.S. troops in Florida in order to force Seminole emigration to the West. Forts were established throughout the Indian territory and columns of soldiers scoured the countryside. Feeling the pressure, many Seminoles, including head chief Micanopy, offered to surrender. The Seminoles slowly gathered for emigration near Tampa, but in June they fled the detention camps, driven off by disease and the presence of slave catchers who were hoping to take Black Seminoles captive.

In December 1837, Jesup began a massive offensive, culminating in the Battle of Lake Okeechobee. Following the American victory in the battle, the war entered a new phase, a long war of attrition. During this time, the government realized that it would be almost impossible to drive the remaining Seminoles from Florida, so Van Buren sent General Alexander Macomb to negotiate a peace with the Seminoles. It was the only time in U.S. history that a Native American nation had forced the United States to sue for peace. An agreement was reached allowing the Seminoles to remain in southwest Florida, but the peace was shattered in July 1839. Fighting was not resolved until 1842, after Van Buren had left office. The United States spent over $30 million in the Second Seminole War, which also cost the lives of over 1400 American military personnel, dozens of civilians, and at least seven hundred Seminole.

Historian Laurence M. Hauptman argues that dishonest and underhanded methods were deliberately employed to remove the Iroquois and Stockbridge-Munsee Indians from their lands in upstate New York without payment. He states that federal officials, James W. Stryker, John F. Schermerhorn, and Random H. Gillet, collaborated with Van Buren in fraudulently imposing the 1838 Treaty of Buffalo Creek using bribery, forgery, corruption, and deception. Meanwhile, in Michigan, the Ottawas managed to remain in their ancestral home land by threatening to join the British in neighboring Canada, and by becoming landowners who had a higher status and were important factors in the local economy. They also deliberately sent their young men into the local wage labor market to make their presence valuable to the white community. They never threatened the local whites and had significant support from the community.

=== Slavery ===
==== Slavery policy ====
The abolitionist movement had gained in popularity during the 1830s, and the activism of abolitionist groups like the American Anti-Slavery Society prompted denunciations from Southern leaders like John C. Calhoun. Van Buren viewed abolitionism as the greatest threat to the nation's unity. He opposed any attempt on the part of Congress to abolish slavery in the District of Columbia against the wishes of the slave-holding states, and to resist the slightest interference with it in the states where it existed. Reflecting the increasing importance of slavery as a topic of national debate, Van Buren was the first president to make use of the word "slavery" in an inaugural address, and his stances led to accusations that he was a "northern man with southern feelings." However, Van Buren was also sensitive to northern concerns about the expansion of slavery, and he opposed the annexation of Texas out of a desire to avoid sectional disputes.

During Van Buren's presidency, congressional leaders sought to avoid divisive debates over slavery through the "gag rule," an informal practice in which any discussion of the abolition of slavery in Congress was immediately tabled. While the gag rule was largely successful in stifling the debate over slavery in the Senate, Congressman (and former President) John Quincy Adams earned notoriety for his efforts to resist the gag rule in the House of Representatives. Adams defeated an attempt at censuring him, but a coalition of Southerners and Northern Democrats ensured that the gag rule remained in place. As the debate over slavery continued to gain prominence, a small group of anti-slavery activists founded the Liberty Party, which would nominate James G. Birney for president in the 1840 election.

==== Amistad case ====
Like the British and Americans, the Spanish had outlawed the importation of slaves from Africa, but high slave mortality rates encouraged smugglers to smuggle captured slaves from Africa into Spanish colony of Cuba. In June 1839, several recently kidnapped Africans took control of La Amistad, a slave ship headed to Cuba. The Africans attempted to sail home, but were tricked by one of the crew members into heading towards the United States, where the Africans were apprehended and brought before the federal court of Judge Andrew T. Judson. The Spanish government demanded that the ship and its cargo (including the Africans) be turned over to them. The Van Buren administration, hoping to minimize the political domestic and international fallout from the incident, supported Spain's position at trial.

Defying the expectations of most observers, Judson ruled that the defendants be set free. After the federal circuit upheld Judson's ruling, the Van Buren administration appealed the case to the Supreme Court. In March 1841, the Supreme Court upheld Judson's ruling, holding that the Africans had been kidnapped illegally. After the case, the abolitionists raised money to pay for the return of the Africans, and they departed from the United States in November 1841. The unique nature of the Amistad case, involving international issues and parties, people of color testifying in federal court, and the participation of former president Adams and other high-profile lawyers, engendered great public interest. The Amistad case drew attention to the personal tragedies of slavery and attracted new support for the growing abolition movement in the North. It also transformed the courts into the principal forum for a national debate on the legal foundations of slavery.

=== Mormons ===
In 1839, Joseph Smith Jr., the founder of the Latter Day Saint movement, visited Van Buren to plead for the U.S. to help the roughly 20,000 Mormon settlers of Independence, Missouri, who had been forced from the state during the 1838 Mormon War. The Governor of Missouri, Lilburn Boggs, had issued an executive order on October 27, 1838, known as the "Extermination Order". It authorized troops to use force against Mormons to "exterminate or drive [them] from the state". In 1839, after moving to Illinois, Smith and his party appealed to members of Congress and to President Van Buren to intercede for the Mormons. According to Smith's grandnephew, Van Buren said to Smith, "Your cause is just, but I can do nothing for you; if I take up for you I shall lose the vote of Missouri".

== Foreign affairs ==
=== Texas ===
The Republic of Texas had gained de facto independence from Mexico in the Texas Revolution, and Texans had subsequently voted overwhelmingly in favor of annexation by the United States. Just before leaving office in March 1837, Andrew Jackson had extended diplomatic recognition to the Republic of Texas, and the possibility of annexation heightened sectional tensions at home while also presenting the possibility of war with Mexico. New England abolitionists charged that there was a "slaveholding conspiracy to acquire Texas", and Daniel Webster eloquently denounced annexation. Many Southern leaders, meanwhile, strongly desired the expansion of slave-holding territory in the United States.

Boldly reversing Jackson's policies, Van Buren sought peace abroad and harmony at home. He proposed a diplomatic solution to a long-standing financial dispute between American citizens and the Mexican government, rejecting Jackson's threat to settle it by force. Likewise, when the Texas minister at Washington, D.C., proposed annexation to the administration in August 1837, he was told that the proposition could not be entertained. Constitutional scruples and fear of war with Mexico were the reasons given for the rejection, but concern that it would precipitate a clash over the extension of slavery undoubtedly influenced Van Buren and continued to be the chief obstacle to annexation. Northern and Southern Democrats followed an unspoken rule in which Northerners helped quash anti-slavery proposals and Southerners refrained from agitating for the annexation of Texas. Texas withdrew the annexation offer in 1838.

=== Relations with Britain ===
==== Canadian rebellions ====
British subjects in Lower Canada and Upper Canada rose in rebellion in 1837 and 1838, protesting their lack of responsible government. While the initial insurrection in Upper Canada ended with the December 1837 Battle of Montgomery's Tavern, many of the rebels fled across the Niagara River into New York, and Canadian leader William Lyon Mackenzie began recruiting volunteers in Buffalo. Mackenzie declared the establishment of the Republic of Canada and put into motion a plan whereby volunteers would invade Upper Canada from Navy Island on the Canadian side of the Niagara River. Several hundred volunteers traveled to Navy Island in the weeks that followed, procuring the steamboat Caroline to deliver supplies to Navy Island. Seeking to deter an imminent invasion, British forces crossed to the American bank of the river in late December 1837, and they burned and sank the Caroline. In the melee, one American was killed and others were wounded. Considerable sentiment arose within the United States to declare war, and a British ship was burned in revenge.

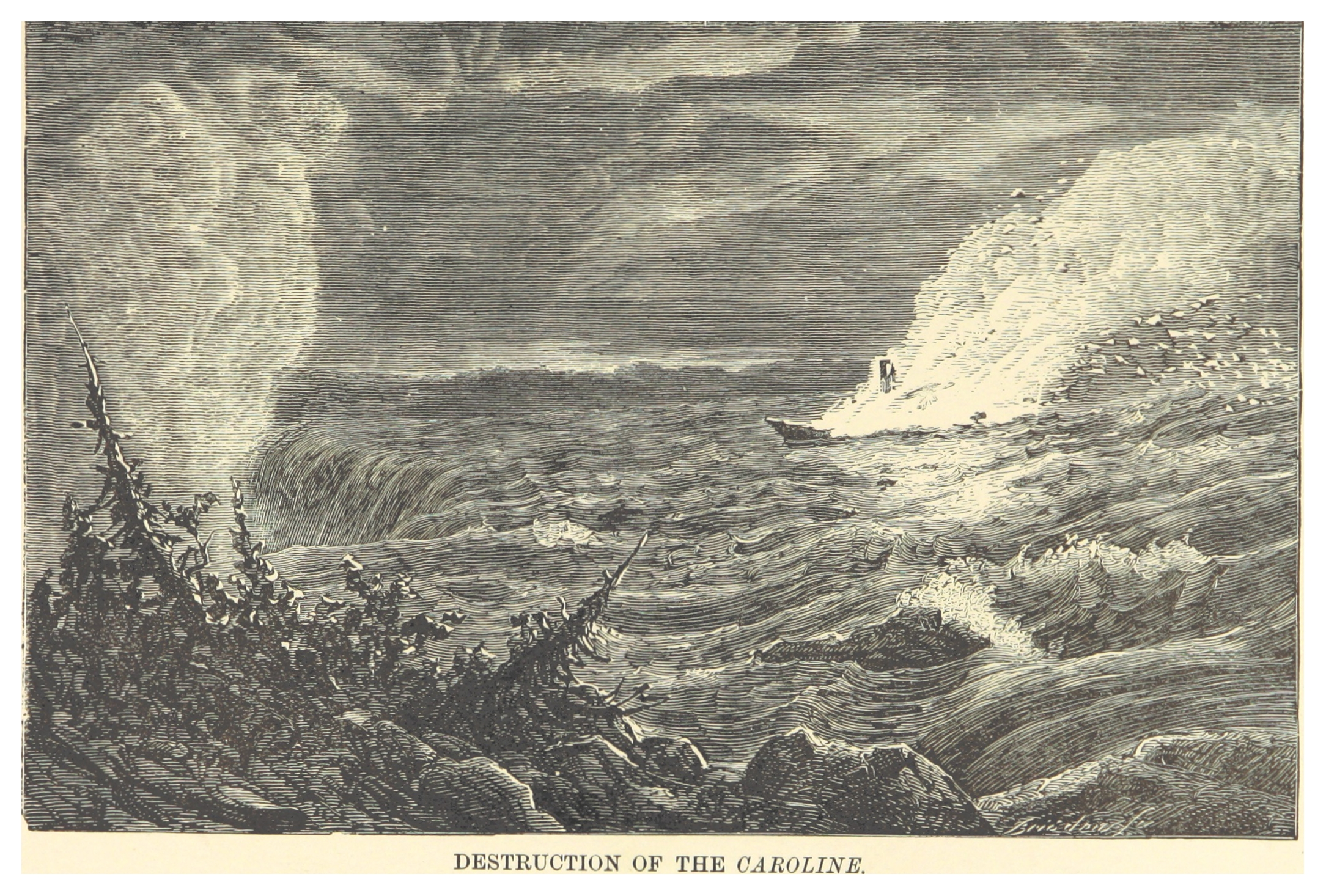
"Destruction of the Caroline", illustration by John Charles Dent (1881)

Van Buren, looking to avoid a war with Great Britain, sent General Winfield Scott to the border with large discretionary powers for its protection and its peace. Scott impressed upon American citizens the need for a peaceful resolution to the crisis, and made it clear that the U.S. government would not support adventuresome Americans attacking the British. In early January 1838, the president proclaimed U.S. neutrality with regard to the Canadian independence issue, a declaration which Congress endorsed by passing a neutrality law designed to discourage the participation of American citizens in foreign conflicts.

Though Scott was able to calm the situation, a group of secret societies known as "Hunters' Lodges" continued to seek the overthrow of British rule in Canada. These groups carried out several attacks in Upper Canada, collectively known as the Patriot War. The administration followed through on its enforcement of the Neutrality Act, encouraged the prosecution of filibusters, and actively deterred U.S. citizens from subversive activities abroad. After the failure of two filibuster expeditions in late 1839, the Hunters' Lodges lost their popular appeal and the Patriot War came to an end. In the long term, Van Buren's opposition to the Patriot War contributed to the construction of healthy Anglo–American and U.S.–Canadian relations in the 20th century; it also led, more immediately, to a backlash among citizens regarding the supposed overreach of federal authority.

==== Aroostook conflict ====
A new crisis between Britain and the United States surfaced in late 1838 in disputed territory on the Maine–New Brunswick frontier. Jackson had been willing to drop American claims to the region in return for other concessions, but Maine was unwilling to drop its claims to the disputed territory. For their part, the British considered possession of the area vital to the defense of Canada. Both American and New Brunswick lumberjacks cut timber in the disputed territory during the winter of 1838–39. On December 29, New Brunswick lumbermen were spotted cutting down trees on an American estate near the Aroostook River. After American woodcutters rushed to stand guard, a shouting match, known as the Battle of Caribou, ensued. Tensions quickly boiled over into a near war with both Maine and New Brunswick arresting each other's citizens, and the crisis seemed ready to turn into an armed conflict.

British troops began to gather along the Saint John River. Governor John Fairfield mobilized the state militia to confront the British in the disputed territory and several forts were constructed. The American press clamored for war; "Maine and her soil, or BLOOD!" screamed one editorial. "Let the sword be drawn and the scabbard thrown away!" In June, Congress authorized 50,000 troops and a $10 million budget in the event foreign military troops crossed into United States territory. Van Buren was unwilling to go to war over the disputed territory, though he assured Maine that he would respond to any attacks by the British. To settle the crisis, Van Buren met with the British minister to the United States, and Van Buren and the minister agreed to resolve the border issue diplomatically. Van Buren also sent General Scott to the northern border area, both to show military resolve, and more importantly, to lower the tensions. Scott successfully convinced all sides to submit the border issue to arbitration. The border dispute was put to rest a few years later, with the signing of the 1842 Webster–Ashburton Treaty.

== Presidential election of 1840 ==
1840 electoral vote results

Van Buren paid close attention to party organization, and support for the communication media such as newspapers and magazines. They received subsidies in the form of government printing contracts. At an intellectual level, his administration was strongly supported by the monthly The United States Magazine and Democratic Review, based in Washington and edited by John L. O'Sullivan. Its editorials and articles provided the arguments that partisans needed to discuss Democratic Party positions on the Mexican War, slavery, states' rights, and Indian removal.

Though he faced no serious opposition for the presidential nomination at the 1840 Democratic National Convention, Van Buren and his party faced a difficult election in 1840. Van Buren's term had been a difficult affair, with the U.S. economy mired in a severe downturn, and other divisive issues, such as slavery, western expansion, and tensions with Great Britain provided numerous for opportunities for Van Buren's political opponents to criticize his actions. Although Van Buren's renomination was never in doubt, Democratic strategists began to question the wisdom of keeping Johnson on the ticket. Even former president Jackson conceded that Johnson was a liability and insisted on former House Speaker James K. Polk of Tennessee as Van Buren's new running mate. Van Buren was reluctant to drop Johnson, who was popular with workers and radicals in the North and added military experience to the ticket, which might prove important if the Whigs nominated William Henry Harrison. Rather than re-nominating Johnson, the Democratic convention decided to allow state Democratic Party leaders to select the vice-presidential candidates for their states. The convention drafted the first party platform in U.S. history, fully endorsing Van Buren's views on economic policy and other matters.

Van Buren hoped that the Whigs would nominate Henry Clay for president, which would allow Van Buren to cast the 1840 campaign as a clash between Van Buren's Independent Treasury system and Clay's support for a revived national bank. Clay had the backing of most Southerners at the 1839 Whig National Convention, but most Northerners favored Harrison. Northern leaders like William Seward and Thaddeus Stevens believed that Harrison's war record would effectively counter the popular appeals of the Democratic Party. General Winfield Scott also had some support, and he loomed as a potential compromise candidate between Clay and Harrison. Due in large part to effective maneuvering by Thurlow Weed and Thaddeus Stevens, Harrison triumphed over Clay on the third ballot of the convention. For vice president, the Whigs nominated former Senator John Tyler of Virginia. Clay was deeply disappointed by his defeat at the convention, but he nonetheless faithfully campaigned for the ticket.

Whigs presented Van Buren as the antithesis of the president, and derided him as ineffective, corrupt, and effete. Whigs contrasted their image of Van Buren as an aristocrat living in high style with images of Harrison as a simple man of the people who sipped cider in a log cabin. Issues of policy were not absent from the campaign; the Whigs derided the alleged executive overreaches of Jackson and Van Buren, while also calling for the re-establishment of the national bank and higher tariffs. Democrats attempted to campaign on the Independent Treasury system, but the onset of deflation undercut these arguments. Many Northerners attacked Van Buren for his support of the gag rule, while in the South, many Whigs claimed that the Virginia-born Harrison would even better safeguard the institution of slavery than did the New Yorker Van Buren.

The popular enthusiasm for "Tippecanoe and Tyler Too," coupled with the country's severe economic recession, propelled Harrison to victory. Ultimately, Harrison won 53 percent of the popular vote, and defeated Van Buren in the electoral vote by a margin of 234 to 60. Voter turnout rose from about 55 percent in 1836 to approximately 80 percent in 1840, which represented the highest turnout in a presidential election up to that point in U.S. history. Van Buren won more votes in 1840 than he had in 1836, but the Whig success in attracting new voters more than canceled out Democratic gains. The Whigs also won control of the House and Senate, making the 1840 election the only time in U.S. history that the Whigs won unified control of Congress and the presidency.

== Historical reputation ==
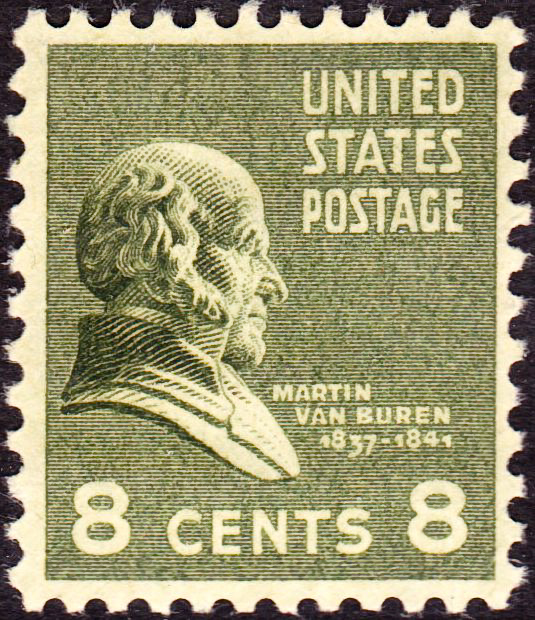
Martin Van Buren on the 8-cent U.S. Postage stamp of the 1938 Presidential Series

According to historian Robert Remini:

Van Buren's creative contribution to the political development of the nation was enormous, and as such he earned his way to the presidency. After gaining control of New York's Republican Party he organized the Albany Regency to run the state in his absence while he pursued a national career in Washington. The Regency was a governing consul in Albany consisting of a group of politically astute and highly intelligent men. He was one of the first statewide political machines in the country where success resulted from its professional use of patronage, the legislative caucus, and the official party newspaper.....[In Washington] he labored to bring about the reorganization of the Republican Party through an alliance between what he called "the planters of the South and the plain Republicans of the North."... Heretofore parties were regarded as evils to be tolerated; Van Buren argued that the party system was the most sensible and intelligent way the affairs of the nation could be democratically conducted, a viewpoint that eventually won national approval.

Van Buren's presidency is considered average, at best, by historians. His time in office was dominated by the economic disaster of the Panic of 1837, and historians have split on the adequacy of the Independent Treasury as a response to that issue. Van Buren's most lasting achievement was as a political organizer who built the Democratic Party and guided it to dominance in the Second Party System, and historians have come to regard Van Buren as integral to the development of the American political system.

A 2017 C-SPAN survey has Martin Van Buren ranked among the bottom third of presidents of all time, right below George W. Bush and above Chester A. Arthur. The survey asked 91 presidential historians to rank the 43 former presidents (including then-out-going president Barack Obama) in various categories to come up with a composite score, resulting in an overall ranking. Van Buren was ranked 34th among all former presidents (down from 31st in 2009, and 30th in 2000). His rankings in the various categories of this most recent poll were as follows: public persuasion (30), crisis leadership (35), economic management (40), moral authority (33), international relations (26), administrative skills (26), relations with congress (28), vision/setting an agenda (33), pursued equal justice for all (30), performance with context of times (33). A 2018 poll of the American Political Science Association's Presidents and Executive Politics section ranked Van Buren as the 27th best president.

Several writers have portrayed Van Buren as among the nation's most obscure presidents. As noted in a 2014 Time magazine article on the "Top 10 Forgettable Presidents":

Making himself nearly disappear completely from the history books was probably not the trick the "Little Magician" Martin Van Buren had in mind, but his was the first truly forgettable American presidency.
