= William M. Gouge =

American economist (1796–1863)

William M. Gouge (1796 – 1863) was an American economist who published A Short History of Paper Money and Banking in the United States, an 1833 treatise that advocated for hard money policies. Following the publication of his treatise, Gouge emerged as an important figure in the presidential administrations of Andrew Jackson and Martin Van Buren, and he played a major role in the creation of the Independent Treasury system. Historian Sean Wilentz writes that, "if anyone was the intellectual architect of Jacksonian economic policy after 1832, it was the Philadelphia radical William Gouge".

== Career ==
Gouge worked as an editor of the Philadelphia Gazette until 1831, gaining a reputation as an expert on the American monetary system. In 1829, Gouge joined several members of the Working Men's Party and some other Philadelphians in publishing an influential report that claimed that banks "laid the foundation of artificial inequality of wealth, and, thereby, artificial inequality of power." In 1833, Gouge published A Short History of Paper Money and Banking in the United States, arguing that banks had a tendency to issue too many bank notes, thereby triggering speculative booms and contributing to inequality. He further held that only precious metals could serve as currency, since, according to Gouge, precious metals were the lone medium of exchange with appropriate levels of both intrinsic value and scarcity. He thus advocated for the abolition of all paper money, starting with bills of smaller denominations. According to historian Paul Conkin, Gouge's treatise was the "most widely read book on serious economic issues" in U.S. history prior to the publication of Progress and Poverty in 1879. It was also republished in Britain by William Cobbett and in Canada by William Lyon Mackenzie.

A Short History of Paper Money Banking in the United States was well-received by members of President Andrew Jackson's administration. At the behest of Vice President Martin Van Buren and Senator Thomas Hart Benton, Gouge was appointed to a clerkship in the United States Department of Treasury. Along with Condy Raguet, Gouge proposed the creation of an independent treasury system, whereby the federal government would store its funds as specie in government-controlled vaults, rather than relying on state banks or the national bank. Influenced by this proposal, President Van Buren (who took office following the 1836 presidential election) called for the establishment of the Independent Treasury, and Congress approved it in June 1840. The Independent Treasury system was abolished in 1841 following Van Buren's defeat in the 1840 presidential election, but the system was revived in 1846 and remained in place until the passage of the Federal Reserve Act in 1913.

== See also ==
- History of central banking in the United States
- History of monetary policy in the United States
- Jacksonian democracy

== Publications ==
- A Short History of Paper Money and Banking in the United States (1833)
- The curse of paper-money and banking; or A short history of banking in the United States of America, with an account of its ruinous effects. (1833)
- An inquiry into the expediency of dispensing with bank agency and bank paper in fiscal concerns of the United States. (1837)
- The Journal of banking, from July 1841 to July 1842 (1841-1842)
- The fiscal history of Texas. (1852)
