= Philadelphia Savings Fund Society =

Former American bank

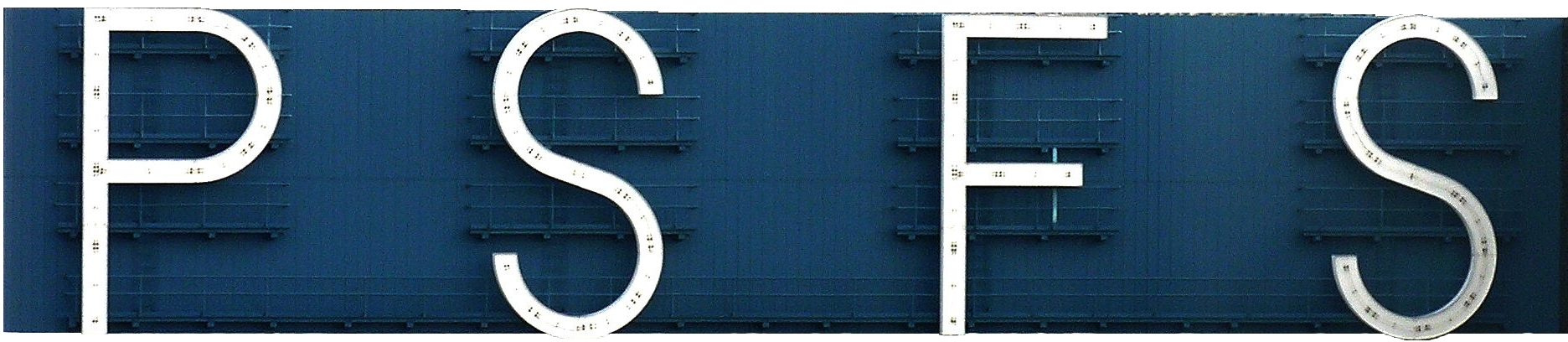
- Type: Public
- Industry: Savings bank
- Founded: 1816 in Philadelphia, Pennsylvania, United States
- Founder: Condy Raguet
- Defunct: 1992
- Fate: Dissolved
- Successor: Mellon Bank
- Headquarters: Philadelphia, Pennsylvania, United States
- Products: Financial services

The Philadelphia Savings Fund Society (PSFS), originally called the Philadelphia Saving Fund Society, was a savings bank headquartered in Philadelphia, Pennsylvania, United States. PSFS was founded in December 1816, the first savings bank to organize and do business in the United States. The bank would develop as one of the largest savings banks in the United States and became a Philadelphia institution. Generations of Philadelphians first opened accounts as children and became lifelong depositors.

The bank was organized by a group of men led by Condy Raguet, who had read about the concept of savings banks becoming popular in Great Britain. The bank quickly began to expand by adding services and branches, and moving into larger headquarters buildings. By the late 1910s, PSFS had the most depositors of any savings bank in the United States; it was second to the Emigrant Savings Bank in the amount of money deposited. PSFS began programs in the 1920s that encouraged children to put money into savings accounts instead of spending it on treats and school programs, allowing children to open accounts with PSFS.

In the 1970s, changes in the personal finance industry led to smaller banks struggling to stay open. A government solution had such banks merge with healthier ones and in 1982, the Western Savings Fund Society was merged with PSFS. The merger deal and changes in regulations allowed PSFS to expand into new business ventures. PSFS quickly began expanding into other fields such as corporate finance, mutual funds, and real estate development.

In 1984 PSFS began doing business under the name Meritor Financial Group to emphasize its expansion into financial services. The new business venture led to the company losing millions of dollars; it was forced to sell off many of its subsidiaries and PSFS bank branches. Despite the effort, Meritor continued to lose money.

On December 11, 1992, federal regulators seized the 176-year-old bank and placed it into the receivership of the Federal Deposit Insurance Corporation (FDIC). The FDIC then sold its remaining assets to Mellon Financial for US$335 million (equivalent to $670 million in 2024). Mellon renamed the former PSFS branches Mellon PSFS, a name which lasted the end of 2001, when the branches were acquired by Citizens Financial Group.

== History ==
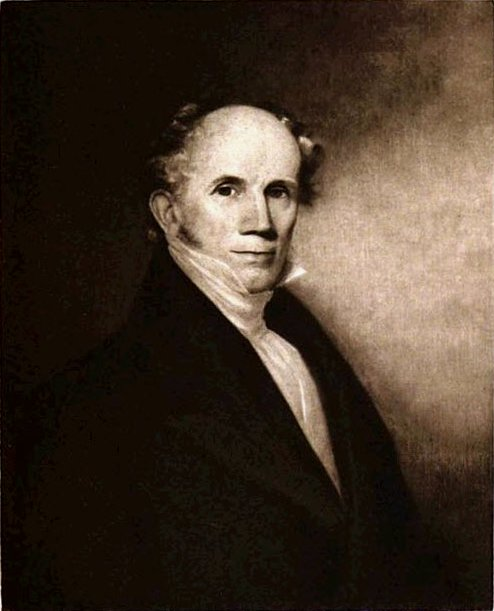
Condy Raguet

=== Founding ===
Founded in 1816, the Philadelphia Saving Fund Society was the first savings bank to organize and do business in the United States. Savings banks had existed in Europe for years and in the early 1810s had grown rapidly through Great Britain. This growth became the topic of numerous journals and pamphlets, some of which were brought to the attention of Philadelphia businessman Condy Raguet in late November 1816.

Interested in the idea, Raguet approached associates, Richard Peters, Clement C. Biddle and Thomas Hale on creating a similar institution in Philadelphia. A meeting was held on November 25 to discuss the plan. A total of twelve men agreed to work together to form the bank. Along with Raguet, Peters, Biddle, and Hale, the other men, called associate founders, were Charles N. Bancker, Andrew Bayard, Samuel Breck, John McCrea, William Schlatter, John C. Stocker, John Strawbridge and Roberts Vaux. Over several meetings the group figured out the bank's structure and positions. Andrew Bayard was elected the first president of the bank during the third meeting on November 28. The bank was named the Philadelphia Saving Fund Society because Raguet felt the name "bank" was unpopular and calling it a society would make it easier to receive a charter from the state legislature.

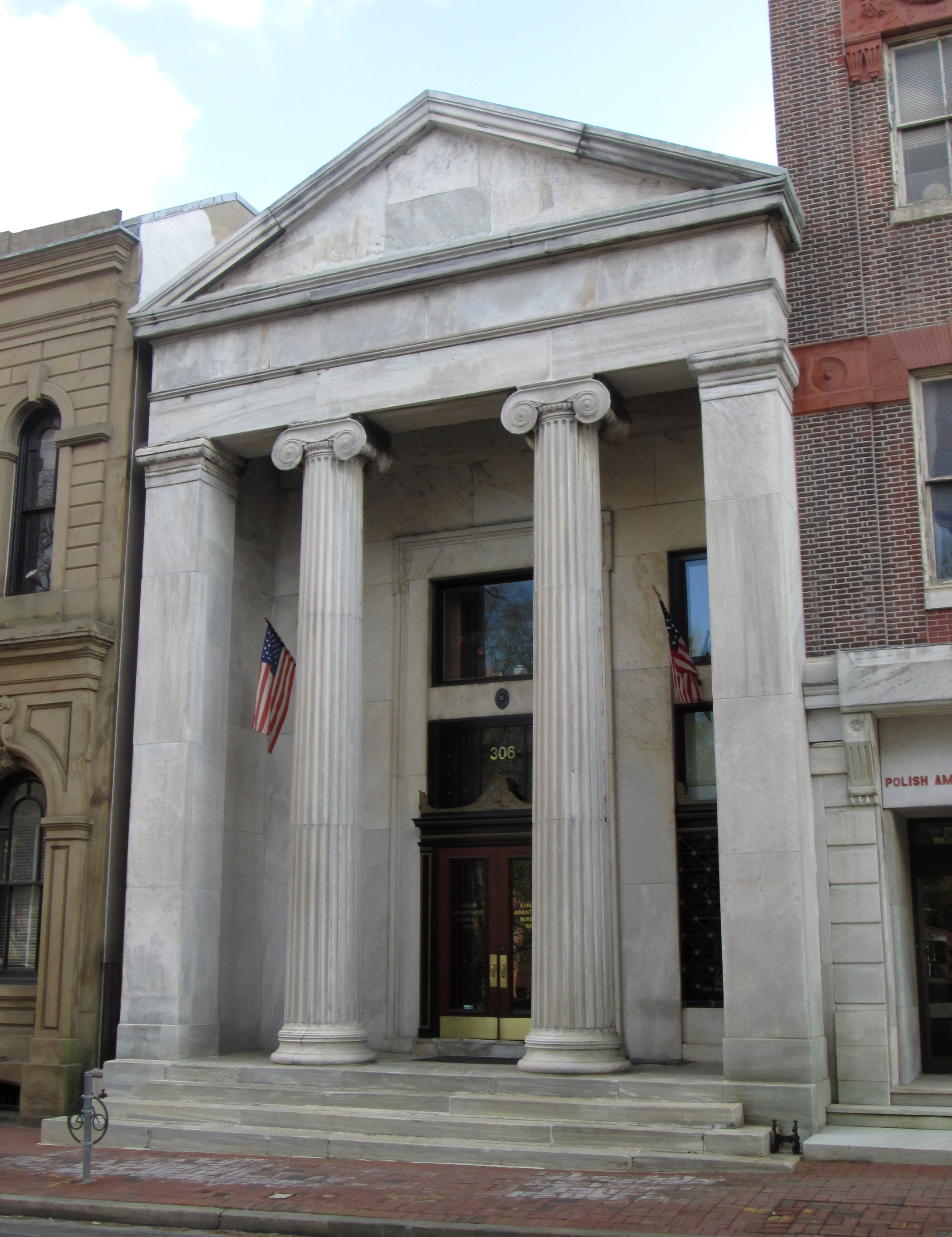
The Society's 1840 headquarters

On December 4, 1816, the Articles of Association, which contain the earliest written use of the name Philadelphia Saving Fund Society, were adopted. The Philadelphia Saving Fund Society (PSFS) opened two days before on December 2 in the office of the Saving Fund Society's first Secretary and Treasurer, George Billington. The office was located on the west side of South Sixth Street, between Chestnut and Market Streets. Depositing five dollars, the first depositor was Curtis Roberts, Raguet's African American servant. On February 25, 1819, the Governor of Pennsylvania approved the Pennsylvania legislature's act of incorporating the Philadelphia Saving Fund Society.

=== Growth ===
PSFS grew slowly, but as early as August 1817 there were resolutions authorizing setting up branch offices outside of Philadelphia in Northern Liberties and Southwark. At first PSFS was open only on Mondays for receiving deposits and Thursdays for giving payments. While PSFS soon opened daily for business, deposits and payments were still only taken on those days. In 1835 PSFS expanded giving out deposits and payments on both Mondays and Thursdays, and in 1865 it was open for all business daily.

In 1818, PSFS issued its first home mortgage to architect William Strickland for US$7,000 (equivalent to $196,063 in 2024). That same year PSFS moved its offices to Sixth and Minor Streets. In the 1820s PSFS moved three more times, to Decatur Street in 1821 and Third and Walnut Streets in 1826. The latter office proved too small, so PSFS quickly bought its own building elsewhere on Walnut Street and moved there on October 2, 1827. By 1833 PSFS again needed more room and PSFS bought property on which the bank built a structure designed by Thomas U. Walter. PSFS moved into the new building in February 1840.

In 1865 PSFS again began looking for a new location and in 1866 a location was found on Seventh and Walnut Streets. Designed by architect Addison Hutton construction began in 1868 and the PSFS Headquarters building was opened for business on October 11, 1869. Forced to expand even more, additions were later made in 1885-86 by Hutton and in 1897–98, designed by Frank Furness.

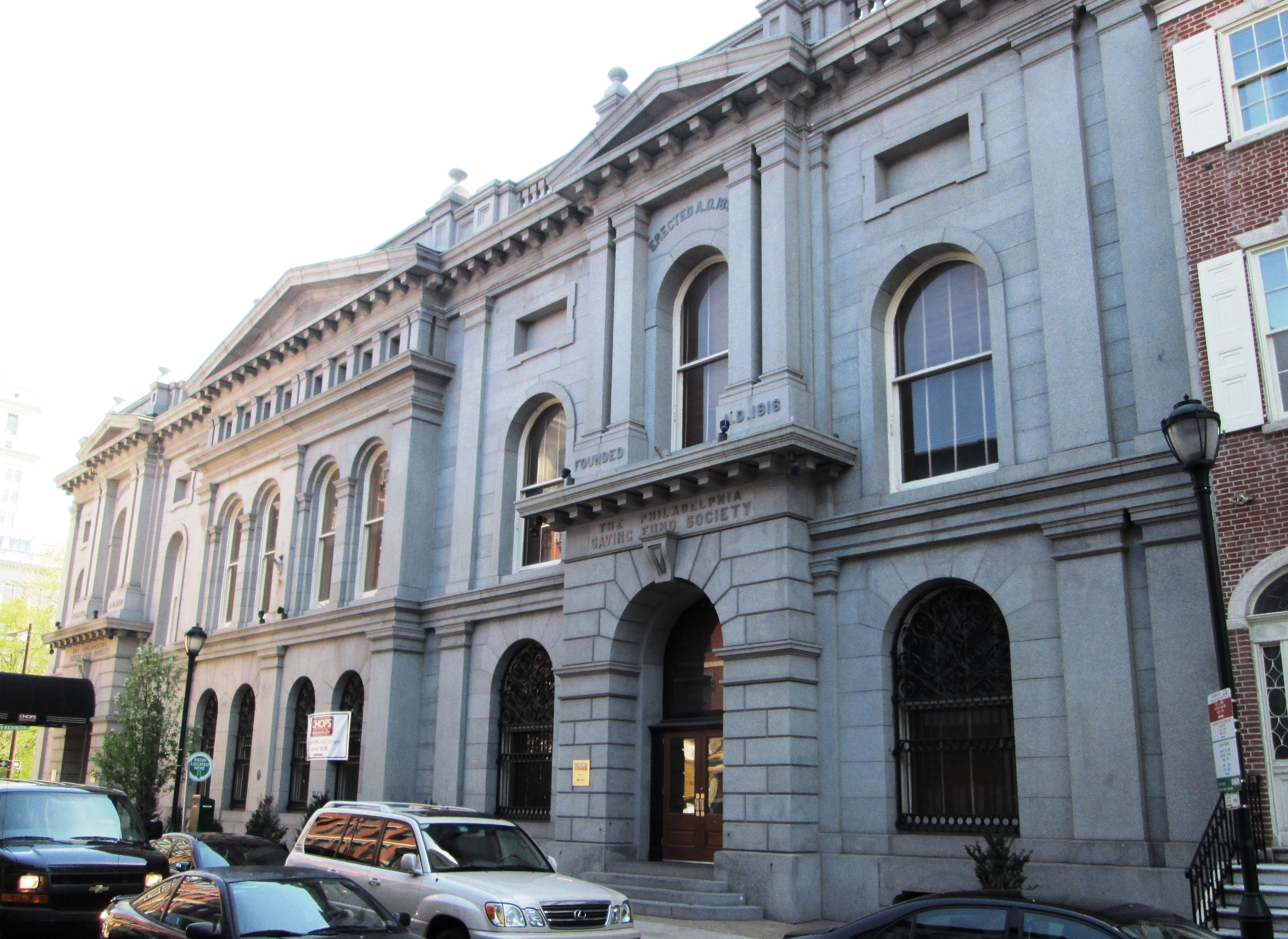
The Society's 1869 headquarters

=== 20th century ===
By 1917 the Philadelphia Savings Fund Society had the largest number of depositors of any savings bank in the United States and was second only to the Emigrant Savings Bank in the amount of money deposited. In 1923 PSFS began the first in-school banking program at William Penn School for Girls. The program was intended to teach children to save by allowing them to deposit money at the bank. In junior high schools PSFS had students work as tellers to collect and record deposits. PSFS also provided a separate counter just for student accounts at their headquarters. The School Accounts Counter included step stools for the youngest depositors. The program helped several generations of Philadelphians open up accounts as children, leading many to become lifelong customers.

Another way PSFS taught children to save money in savings banks was a program that produced pageants for playgrounds and settlement houses. The pageants included songs about thriftiness set to popular music, cheers, speeches that quoted historical figures' opinions on thriftiness, and a play. In the plays, costumed children warned the audience about spending money on treats, movies, and penny arcades instead of putting the money in a savings bank where it would grow.

By the end of the 1920s PSFS was the third largest savings bank in the United States and in 1935 was ranked thirty-fourth largest savings bank in the world. In 1932 PSFS built a new headquarters building on Market Street. The new PSFS Building was the first international style skyscraper built in the United States. The modern skyscraper was designed by George Howe and William Lescaze and is topped with the Philadelphia Saving Fund Society's initials in 27 feet (8.2 m) red neon letters.

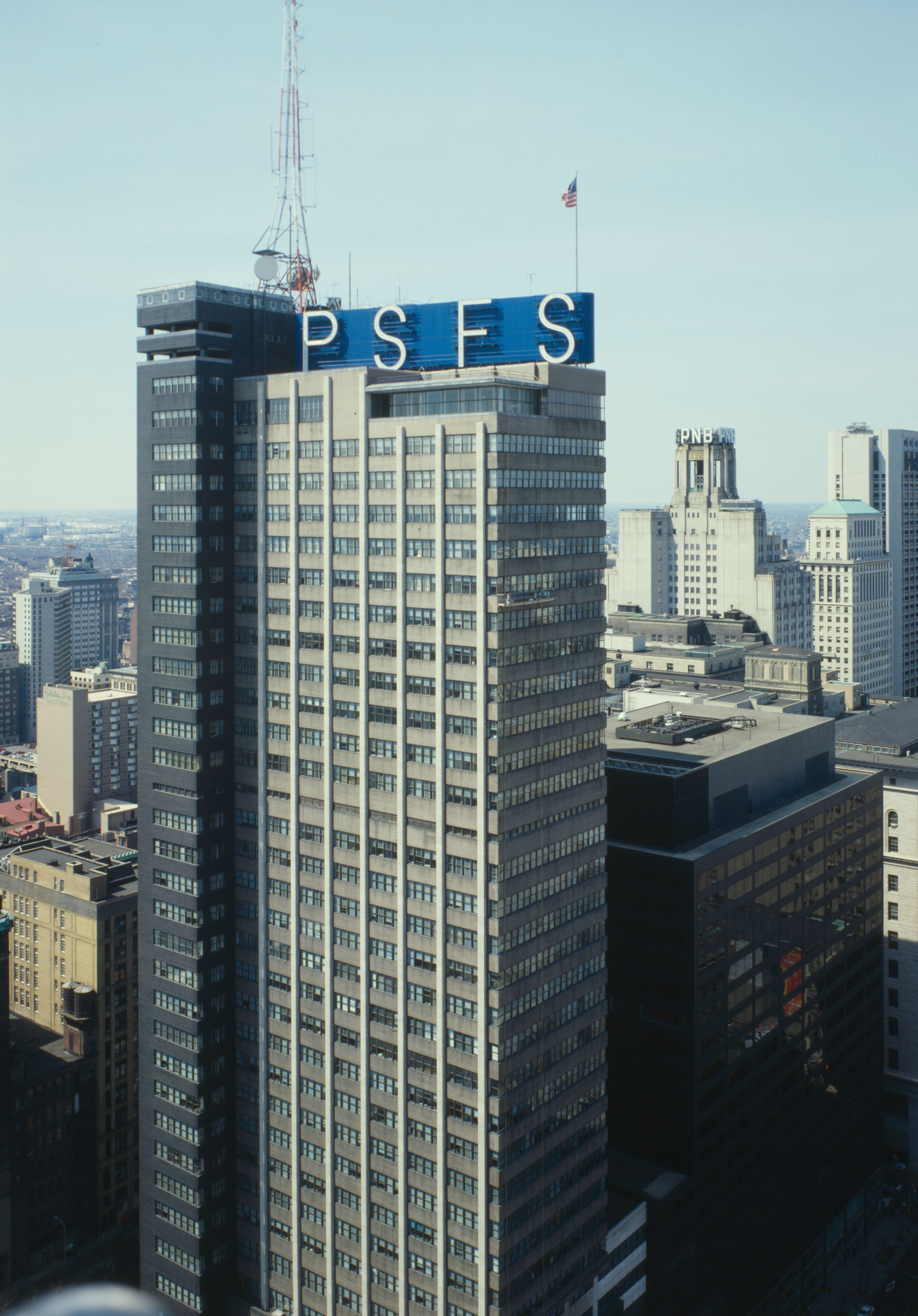
The PSFS Building

In 1948, PSFS was the second largest savings bank in the United States with deposits totaling US$594,460,363 (equivalent to $6.19 billion in 2024). In the 1960s PSFS, along with three other Philadelphia savings banks, established a US$20 million (equivalent to $137 million in 2024) pool to finance mainly low and moderate income minority families.

=== Expansion and crisis ===
The United States in the 1970s saw numerous changes to personal finance such as the advent of credit cards, money-market funds and automated teller machines. These changes resulted in a crisis for traditional community banks. The crisis prompted the government to step in with a solution to force mergers between troubled banks and healthy banks such as PSFS. In April 1982, PSFS merged with the Western Savings Fund Society, receiving US$294 million (equivalent to $806 million in 2024) in assistance from the Federal Deposit Insurance Corporation (FDIC). The merger gained PSFS US$2 billion (equivalent to $5.48 billion in 2024) in assets. FDIC also credited PSFS with US$800 million (equivalent to $2.19 billion in 2024) in "supervisory goodwill".

The deals also allowed the merged banks to expand into new business ventures. PSFS soon began expanding into new services such as equipment leasing, corporate finance and real estate development. In September 1983, PSFS converted from a mutual organization to a stock organization selling 35 million shares at US$11.25 each. In January 1984, PSFS began expanding into financial service by buying a loan portfolio and mortgage business from General Electric Credit Corp. for US$568 million (equivalent to $1.45 billion in 2024). In April 1985, the company acquired four savings and loans in Florida and began paying five cents per share quarterly dividend to stockholders. In September of that year, PSFS began doing business under the name Meritor Financial Group to emphasize its expansion into financial services. In 1986, Meritor began operating mutual funds through a subsidiary, completing the transition to a full-service financial institution.

In 1986, the bank went to the U.S. Supreme Court to defend itself against a claim of sexual harassment. In Meritor Savings Bank v. Vinson, the court found the bank liable under the 1964 Civil Rights Act.

Things soon took a turn for the worse as the company began losing millions through its new business ventures as its competitors began encroaching on Meritor's home market. Meritor's stock prices continuously dropped from almost the moment they were first issued. In August 1985, Meritor revealed it invested $215 million (equivalent to $531 million in 2024) in a Virginia mortgage company that went bankrupt, and in October 1987, Meritor halted its dividend after announcing a third-quarter loss of $379.6 million (equivalent to $897 million in 2024). That same month the company also announced plans to sell some of its operations.

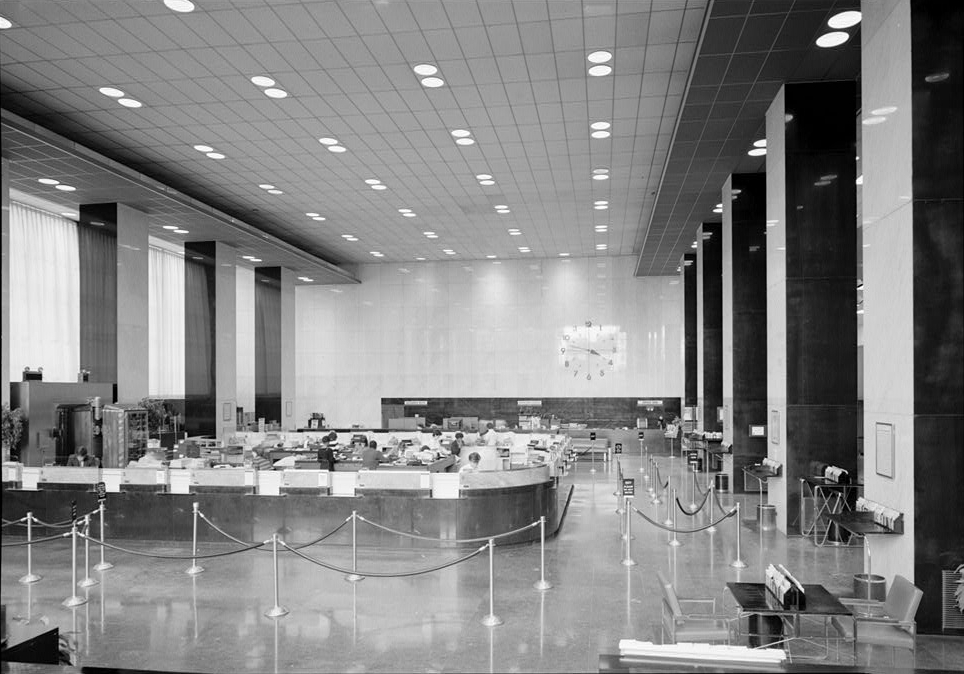
PSFS Building's banking hall, 1985

In January 1988 venture capitalist Frank Slattery bought 5.5 percent of Meritor's stock, becoming the controlling shareholder. Slattery began pushing for changes and in June, with help from others, was able to demote chairman and CEO Frederick S. Hammer to president and replace him with Roger S. Hillas. To try to stanch the losses Hillas sold Meritor's credit-card portfolio and some of its subsidiaries. Continuing to lose money, Meritor sold 54 suburban branches of PSFS, more than half of its branches, to Pittsburgh-based Mellon Bank for US$335 million (equivalent to 735 million in 2024) in 1989. The deal, which included selling Mellon Bank the right to use the name PSFS, shed US$4.9 billion (equivalent to $10.8 billion in 2024) in assets from Meritor. Earlier that year an extra "s" was added to the word "Saving" in the bank branches' name, becoming the Philadelphia Savings Fund Society. When the deal went into effect in 1990 Meritor turned off the PSFS on the PSFS Building saying it was inappropriate to use the sign. Turning off the sign provoked protest from the public, historians and architecture buffs and Meritor and Mellon Bank agreed to relight the sign.

Despite the effort, conditions continued to deteriorate for Meritor and other banks around the United States. Not helping matters was a poor commercial real-estate market that left Meritor with empty Philadelphia office buildings and half-finished suburban strip shopping malls valued at fractions of their original cost. In February 1991, regulators demanded higher capital standards which Meritor failed to meet. A few months later in August, Meritor ending a troublesome dispute with bondholders by giving up 37 percent of its common stock plus cash to redeem US$115 million (equivalent to $235 million in 2024) in debt.

By October 1992, bank analysts had listed Meritor among institutions most likely to be seized by the end of the year. In the next month, worried depositors withdrew more than US$100 million (equivalent to $200 million in 2024) from PSFS branches. On December 4, Meritor sold off its Florida-based savings and loan subsidiary, the company's last out-of-state banking operation. On December 11, 1992, the Office of Thrift Supervision seized Meritor and placed it into the receivership of the FDIC, who sold Meritor's 27 remaining branches to Mellon Bank for US$181 million (equivalent to $362 million in 2024).

== Aftermath ==
=== Mellon PSFS ===
After purchasing the PSFS bank branches and the PSFS name from Meritor, Mellon began operating its bank branches as Mellon PSFS. Acquiring the remainder of the PSFS branches from Meritor in 1992, Mellon continued to expand in the 1990s including the construction of combination Mellon PSFS and Acme Markets branches, the first of which opened in 1994. In 2001, Mellon PSFS had 350 branches and 650,000 customers in Pennsylvania, South New Jersey and Delaware. Mellon PSFS's parent company, Mellon Financial, was interested in abandoning its retail banking assets and focus on high income investments. On July 17, 2001, Mellon Financial announced it was selling its retail banking business, including Mellon PSFS, to Citizens Financial Group for US$2 billion (equivalent to $3.37 billion in 2024). At the end of November 2001, all Mellon PSFS branches became branches of the newly formed Citizens Bank of Pennsylvania.

=== Lawsuit ===
The money Mellon Bank paid went to the FDIC, leaving Meritor's stockholders with nothing. In 1993 Slattery—who had long opposed government interference in business—sued the FDIC, claiming regulators reneged on their 1982 promise to permit goodwill in the company's merger with Western Savings Fund Society. The lawsuit kept the stock for the now defunct company alive with speculators buying shares for as little as 5 cents with hopes of a government payout to settle the case. Most of the 55 million outstanding Meritor shares are believed to be owned by speculators or PSFS depositors who had bought shares when the company first went public.

Over the next decade there was little news on the progress of the case, with a website, meritorpsfs.com, the main source of information. On August 16, 2002, a judge ruled that the FDIC was wrong in seizing Meritor and that shareholders were entitled to damages. On February 10, 2006, Meritor investors were awarded US$371.7 million (equivalent to $555 million in 2024), totaling US$6.75 a share.

In Slattery (Meritor Savings) v. U.S., after losing before a three-judge panel of the Federal Circuit, the government petitioned for a rehearing en banc. The court has agreed to review whether the trial court had the appropriate jurisdiction to hear the breach of contract dispute. The government is further arguing that the FDIC is Non-Appropriated Fund Instrumentality (NAFI), an agency created by the executive branch that receives no funding, and will not receive any funding, from the government. The FDIC receives funding by charging banks fees to member banks. If the en banc court agrees and finds that appropriated funds may not be used to pay judgments against NAFI's, then any judgment in the Meritor Savings case will be produced by the banks regulated by the FDIC and not by Treasury dollars. In other words, the FDIC could be found to be in breach, but it would be entitled to recover the judgment by member banks. In order to find the FDIC a NAFI, the government is arguing that Congress has no obligation to honor its promises to back deposits with the full faith and credit of the United States.
