= Condy Raguet =

American politician

Chargé d'Affaires Condy Raguet
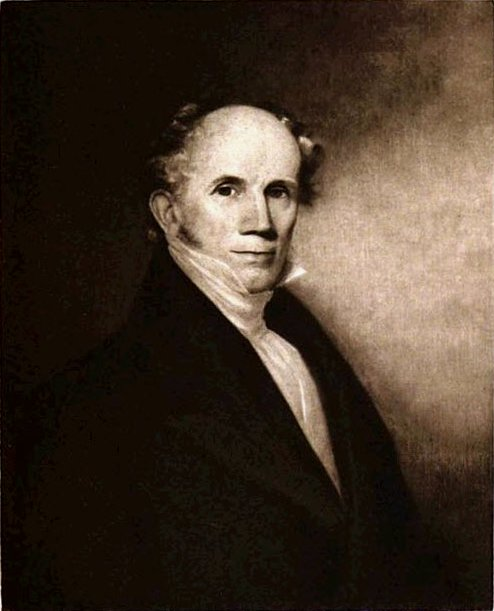

1st United States Ambassador to Brazil
- In office October 29, 1825 – April 16, 1827
- President: John Quincy Adams
- Preceded by: Office established
- Succeeded by: William Tudor

Member of the Pennsylvania Senate from the 1st district
- In office 1818–1821
- Preceded by: Michael Leib
- Succeeded by: Robert McMullin

Personal details
- Born: January 28, 1784 Philadelphia, Pennsylvania, United States
- Died: March 22, 1842 (aged 58) Philadelphia, Pennsylvania, United States
- Party: Federalist Party
- Spouse: Catherine S. Simmons (1788–1877)
- Education: University of Pennsylvania
- Profession: Businessman, Editor

Condy Raguet (January 28, 1784 – March 22, 1842) was the first chargé d'affaires from the United States to Brazil and a noted politician and free trade advocate from Philadelphia, Pennsylvania. Of French descent, Raguet was educated at the University of Pennsylvania. After graduating he began studying law but had to give up his studies after the death of his father. He briefly worked as supercargo for a counting house, before going into business for himself. He later worked as manager or president for several companies, the most notable being the Philadelphia Savings Fund Society. In 1816 Raguet read about the growth of savings banks in Great Britain and liked the idea; he approached other Philadelphia business associates and together they created the Society, the first savings bank in the United States.

As a member of the Federalist Party Raguet was elected to the Pennsylvania House of Representatives in 1815 and to the Pennsylvania State Senate in 1818. In 1821 President James Monroe made Raguet consul to Brazil. After Brazil became independent, President John Quincy Adams made Raguet the chargé d'affaires to Brazil. In this post, Raguet became increasingly frustrated with Brazil's lack of response to complaints by the United States of its citizens being forced to work on Brazilian warships against their will. Raguet's communications with the Brazilian government became increasingly forceful and undiplomatic to the point that he once wrote to the U.S. State Department that he was so frustrated he could hardly consider the Brazilians a civilized people. Despite urges from Washington, D.C. to improve his approach to Brazil, Raguet abruptly left the country after the Imperial Brazilian Navy seized a former U.S. warship. Adams would later write that, despite having good intentions, Raguet's "rashness and intemperance" nearly "brought this country and Brazil to the very verge of war."

After Adams rejected any possibility of Raguet's returning to diplomatic work, Raguet returned to business in Philadelphia. Having his economic views shaped by the Panic of 1819, he became one of the most prominent advocates of free trade in the United States. He edited numerous journals relating to free trade and wrote and published works on the subject. The most notable was On Currency and Banking; published in 1839, Samuel J. Tilden called it "the best treatise on banking ever published in the country".

== Biography ==
Condy Raguet was born on January 28, 1784, in Philadelphia, Pennsylvania. Of French descent, Raguet was educated at the University of Pennsylvania and for eighteen months after graduating he studied law. He had to give up his studies after the death of his father and became a merchant for a counting house. In 1804 he was sent to Santo Domingo as supercargo for a ship. He spent four months there and on his return he wrote and published A Short Account of the Present State of Affairs in St. Domingo. Raguet returned for eight months in 1805 and again published a book about events on the island. On December 23, 1807, Raguet was married to Catherine S. Simmons.

In 1806, Raguet went into business and soon became the president and manager of several companies. During the War of 1812 he served as a colonel and took a prominent role in preparing defenses for Philadelphia. In 1815 Raguet went into politics when he was elected to the Pennsylvania House of Representatives as a member of the Federalist Party. In 1818 he was elected to the Pennsylvania State Senate for the 1st district, a position he held until 1821.

He was elected to the American Philosophical Society in 1822.

=== Philadelphia Savings Fund Society ===
In 1816, while president of the Pennsylvania Company for Insurances on Lives and Granting Annuities, Raguet read journals and pamphlets about the growth of savings banks in Great Britain. Interested in the idea, he communicated the concept to some other businessmen he knew, and together they created the Philadelphia Savings Fund Society. The first savings bank in the United States, the Philadelphia Savings Fund Society would eventually grow into a respected Philadelphia institution that would last until 1992. Raguet was active in the early workings of the Philadelphia Savings Fund Society, working on committees to set up company operations, drafting by-laws, and creating a charter. In 1820 he submitted his resignation to the Board of Directors of the Philadelphia Savings Fund Society due to planned absences from the city. Initially the board rejected his resignation, but after he stopped attending board meetings, the board accepted his resignation in July 1821.

Other activities of Raguet included law, with Raguet being admitted to the Philadelphia bar association in 1820. At other points in his life Raguet was president of the Chamber of Commerce and a member of the American Philosophical Society. As early as 1816 Raguet was also active in creation of a congregation based on Swedenborgianism.

=== Brazil ===
In 1821 President James Monroe appointed Raguet the United States consul in Rio de Janeiro. During his tenure, between 1822 and 1825, he negotiated a commercial treaty with Brazil. When the United States was preparing to formally recognize a newly independent Brazil through appointment of a chargé d'affaires, Secretary of State John Quincy Adams recommended Raguet for the post. Despite urges to complete formalizing relations between the United States and Brazil, President James Monroe did not appoint anyone before the end of his term. Almost immediately after taking office, President Adams appointed Raguet chargé d'affaires to Brazil on March 9, 1825.

Raguet became the first chargé d'affaires from the United States to Brazil on October 29, 1825. One of the first issues he dealt with was the blockade of Argentine ports by the Imperial Brazilian Navy during the Cisplatine War. Argentina was a growing trade partner of the United States and Raguet and his counterpart in Argentina worked to convince Brazil to restrict its blockade to only certain ports and that ships approaching the blockade should be given warning before being seized by Brazil. After negotiations, Brazil restricted its blockade to only ports in the Río de la Plata, but the blockade still encompassed more ports than the United States was pressing for. Brazil never made it a policy to give ships warning, but many ships were warned and let go.

Relations between Brazil and the United States were strained over the recruiting of United States seamen for Brazilian warships through fraud and coercion. United States citizens were enticed onto Brazilian ships and after the end of their voluntary enlistment period were forced to stay. Raguet became exhausted with how the Brazilian government never followed up its promises to investigate the complaints. The issue only got worse as United States merchant ships were seized by Brazil for attempting or intending to bypass the blockade. The crews of the ships were often manipulated into Brazilian service or imprisoned. Tensions over the issue continued to rise particularly after a US Navy commander, backed by force, procured the release of two detained Americans. Eventually the Brazilian Navy ordered all ships to immediately surrender all improperly detained United States citizens. Despite the order, Raguet was increasingly frustrated with what he felt was Brazil's purposeful delay in processing detained United States ships and citizens. After receiving approval from Secretary of State Henry Clay on his efforts, Raguet was emboldened and his notes to the Brazilian government became more forceful and undiplomatic.

After a letter from a Brazilian foreign minister requested that Raguet use more moderation in his communications, he wrote to Clay that the Brazilian government was offended by his communications, that he had lost his patience with them, and that he hardly considered the Brazilians a civilized people. By the end of 1826 copies of letters of Raguet's communications to the Brazilian government had reached the State Department in Washington, D.C. Henry Clay wrote back indicating it would be best to use "language firm and decisive, but at the same time temperate and respectful. No cause is ever benefited by the manifestation of passion, or by the use of harsh and uncourtious language." Responding to a request Raguet made to threaten to sever diplomatic relations with Brazil if they did not release their ships, Clay said "war or threats of war ought not to be employed as instruments of redress until after the failure of every peaceful experiment."

By early 1827 relations with Brazil improved after a new foreign minister took office, but that quickly changed in March when Brazil seized the USS Spark, a recently decommissioned U.S. warship. After a rebuffed offer to the sell the Spark to Brazil, the ship headed for Montevideo. On the way, the ship was seized by a Brazilian man-of-war and its crew imprisoned. Brazil demanded an explanation for what it said were irregularities in the Spark's activities and suspected the ship was a privateer going to join Argentina. Raguet didn't believe the Brazilians actually believed the Spark was a privateer, and felt that what he called "the most deliberate and high handed insult" against the United States was planned days in advance. The incident with the Spark was the last straw for Raguet. He sent a letter to the Brazilian government saying "that recent occurrences induce him to withdraw from the court of Brazil, and he therefore requests that his excellency will furnish him the necessary passports." He left his position as chargé d'affaires ended on April 16, 1827.

Once Washington found out that Raguet had left Brazil, the State Department quickly worked to appoint someone new to repair any damage caused by Raguet and to continue working on solving the issues with Brazil that had led Raguet to leave. Adams would later write that relations between the United States and Brazil were "aggravated by the rashness and intemperance of Condy Raguet, ... [who had] brought this country and Brazil to the very verge of war." On Raguet's return to the United States he held a meeting with Clay and Adams who said "I told him that my opinion of his integrity, patriotism, and zeal was unimpaired; that I was convinced of the purity of his motives to the step he had taken; but that I thought it would have been better if he had, before taking that step, consulted his government." When Raguet was suggested for another ambassadorial position in 1828 Adams felt that while Raguet's motives were good he felt putting someone with "such a temper and want of judgment, who took blustering for bravery and insolence for energy, was too dangerous."

In 1836 he returned to the Philadelphia Savings Fund Society where he worked until his death a few years later. Raguet died in Philadelphia on March 22, 1842, and was interred at Lower Burial Ground (Hood Cemetery) in Philadelphia.

== Economic views ==
Since the end of the War of 1812, Raguet was a leading inflationist, supporting deliberate inflation through increasing the available supply of currency and credit. However, his position changed after the Panic of 1819. The Panic also converted Raguet from a protectionist to a leading promoter of free trade. While a state senator, Raguet sent a questionnaire to legislators and prominent citizens in each county of the state to determine the extent of the depression. One of the questions was "Do you consider that the advantages of the banking system outweigh its evils?" Sixteen out of nineteen counties answered in the negative. Raguet concluded that the depression was a result of bank credit expansion and the subsequent contraction as physical money was drained from the bank's vaults. He promoted restrictions on banks and of granting bank charters.

After returning to the United States from Brazil, he became a publicist on free trade doctrines contributing to the Port-Folio and other periodicals. He also edited several journals relating to free trade, including The Free-Trade Advocate, The Examiner and The Financial Register. In the late 1830s he continued writing, authoring The Principals of Free Trade (1835) and On Currency and Banking (1839). On Currency and Banking, which was called "the best treatise on banking ever published in the country" by Samuel J. Tilden, was republished in Great Britain in 1839 and translated into French in 1840.

== Published works ==
- A Short Account of the Present State of Affairs in St. Domingo (1804)
- A Circumstantial Account of the Massacre in St. Domingo (1805)
- An Inquiry into the Causes of the Present State of the Circulating Medium of the United States (1815)
- The Principals of Free Trade (1835)
- On Currency and Banking (1839)

Pennsylvania State Senate
| Preceded by Michael Leib | Member of the Pennsylvania Senate, 1st district 1818-1821 | Succeeded by Robert McMullin |
Diplomatic posts
| New title Brazilian Independence | United States Chargé d'Affaires, Brazil; 29 October 1825 – 16 April 1827 | Succeeded by William Tudor |
