= 1840 United States presidential election =

Election of William Henry Harrison

- October 30 – November 23, 1840

294 members of the Electoral College 148 electoral votes needed to win
- Turnout: 80.3% (▲23.9 pp)
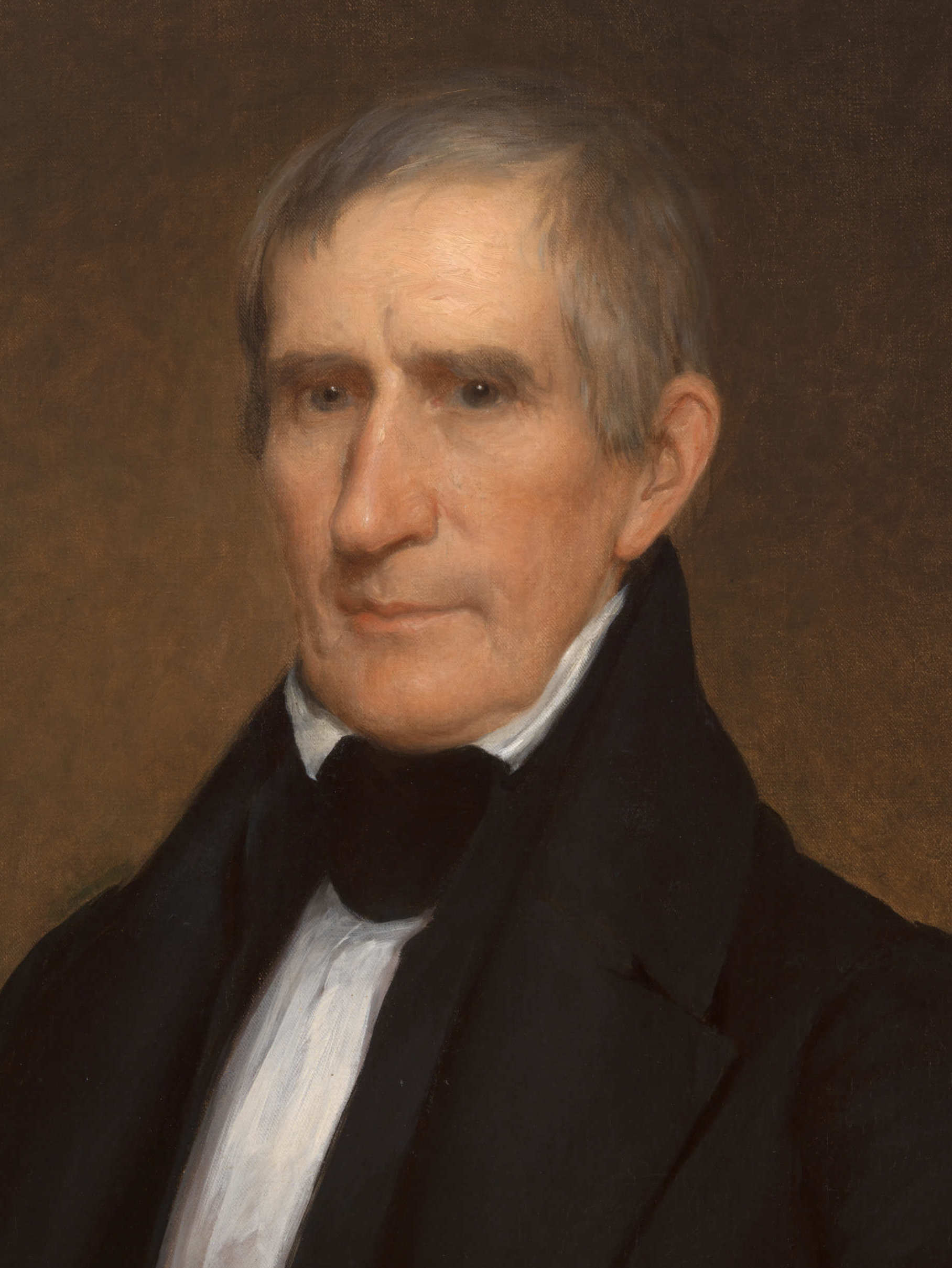

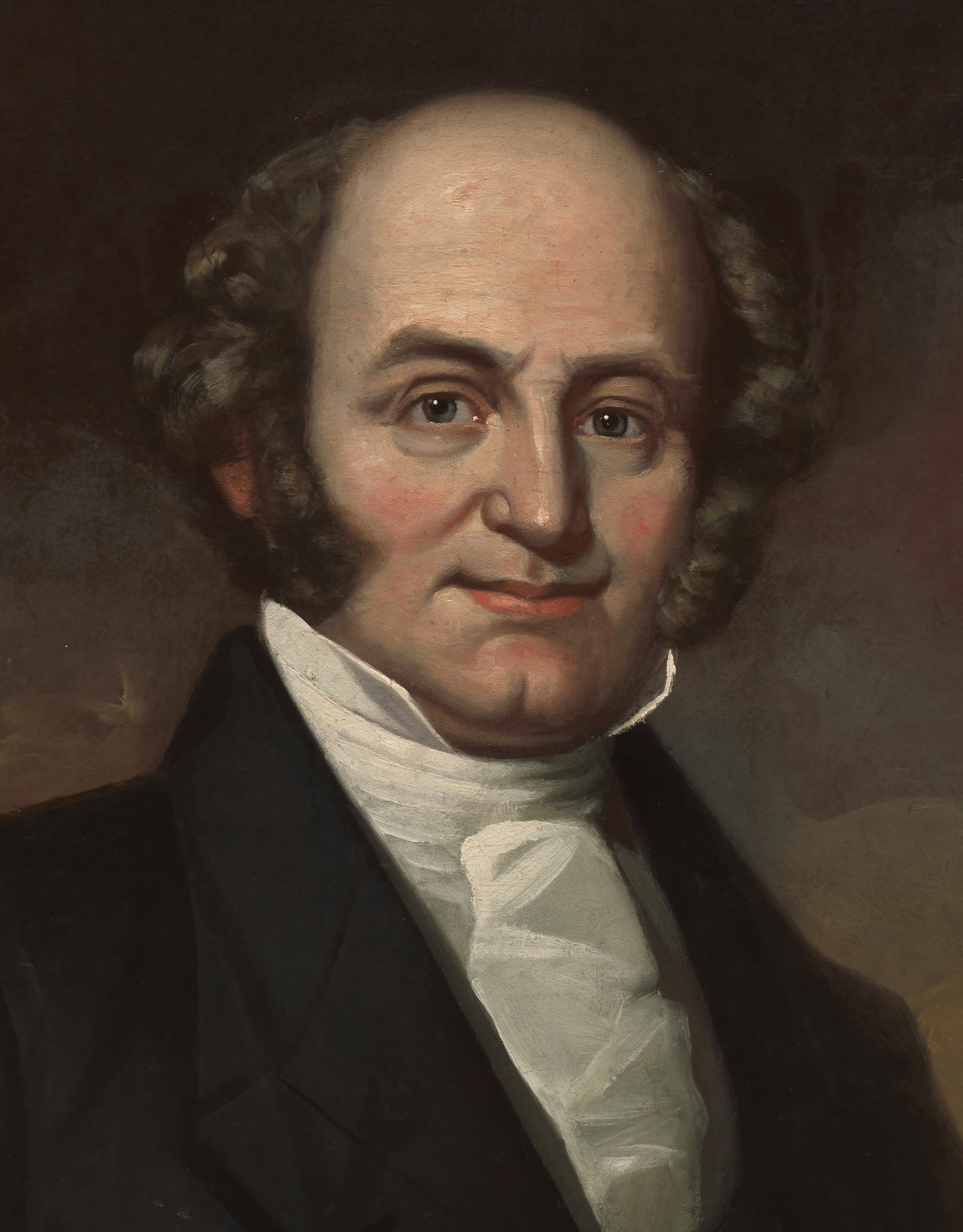
Nominee	William Henry Harrison	Martin Van Buren
Party	Whig	Democratic
Alliance	Anti-Masonic
Home state	Ohio	New York
Running mate	John Tyler	N/A (Note: While there was no official Democratic nominee, the majority of the Democratic electors still cast their electoral votes for incumbent vice president Richard Mentor Johnson.)
Electoral vote	234	60
States carried	19	7
Popular vote	1,275,390	1,128,854
Percentage	52.9%	46.8%
- Presidential election results map. Buff denotes states won by Harrison/Tyler and Blue by Van Buren. Numbers indicate the number of electoral votes cast by each state.
President before election
Martin Van Buren
Democratic
Elected President
William Henry Harrison
Whig

A presidential election was held in the United States from October 30 to December 2, 1840. In the shadow of an incomplete economic recovery from the Panic of 1837, Whig nominee William Henry Harrison defeated incumbent President Martin Van Buren of the Democratic Party. The election marked the first of two Whig victories in presidential elections, but was the only one where they won a majority of the popular vote. This was also the third rematch in American history.

In 1839, the Whigs held a national convention for the first time. The 1839 Whig National Convention saw 1836 nominee William Henry Harrison defeat former Secretary of State Henry Clay and General Winfield Scott. Van Buren faced little opposition at the 1840 Democratic National Convention, but controversial Vice President Richard Mentor Johnson was not renominated. The Democrats thus became the only major party since 1800 to fail to select a vice presidential nominee.

Referencing vice presidential nominee John Tyler and Harrison's participation in the Battle of Tippecanoe, the Whigs campaigned on the slogan of "Tippecanoe and Tyler Too." With Van Buren weakened by economic woes, Harrison won a popular majority and 234 of 294 electoral votes. Voter participation surged as white male suffrage became nearly universal, and a contemporary record of 42.4% of the voting age population voted for Harrison. Van Buren's loss made him the third president to lose re-election.

The Whigs did not enjoy the benefits of victory. The 67-year-old Harrison, the oldest U.S. president elected until Ronald Reagan won the 1980 election, died a little more than a month after inauguration. Harrison was succeeded by John Tyler, who unexpectedly proved not to be a Whig. While Tyler had been a staunch supporter of Clay at the convention, he was a former Democrat, a passionate supporter of states' rights, and effectively an independent. As President, Tyler blocked the Whigs' legislative agenda and was expelled from the Whig Party, subsequently the second independent (after Washington) to serve as president. Van Buren would be the last incumbent president to lose his reelection bid in a general election until fellow Democrat Grover Cleveland in 1888. This was also the last time a challenger to an incumbent president got a majority of the vote until 1932. This was also the last time as of 2024 where the incumbent president seeking re-election flipped a state yet failed to secure re-election, with Van Buren winning South Carolina, despite losing it four years earlier, and losing re-election to Harrison.

== Nominations ==
=== Whig Party nomination ===
1840 Whig Party ticket
William Henry Harrison	John Tyler
for President	for Vice President
United States Minister for Gran Columbia (1829)	U.S. Senator from Virginia (1827–1836); President pro tempore of the Senate (1835)
Campaign

The first national convention of the Whig Party was called for by members of the party in Congress and it was attended by almost 250 delegates in Harrisburg, Pennsylvania. Henry Clay, William Henry Harrison, and Winfield Scott ran for the party's presidential nomination. The delegations of each state balloted separately before meeting together with the other representatives of the states. Clay initially led on the first ballot, but Harrison won on the final ballot with 148 votes compared to Clay's 90 votes and Scott's 16 votes after supporters from Scott switched to Harrison. John Tyler was selected as a factional and geographical balance to Harrison.

=== Democratic Party nomination ===
1840 Democratic Party ticket
Martin Van Buren	None
for President	for Vice President
8th President of the United States (1837–1841)	N/A

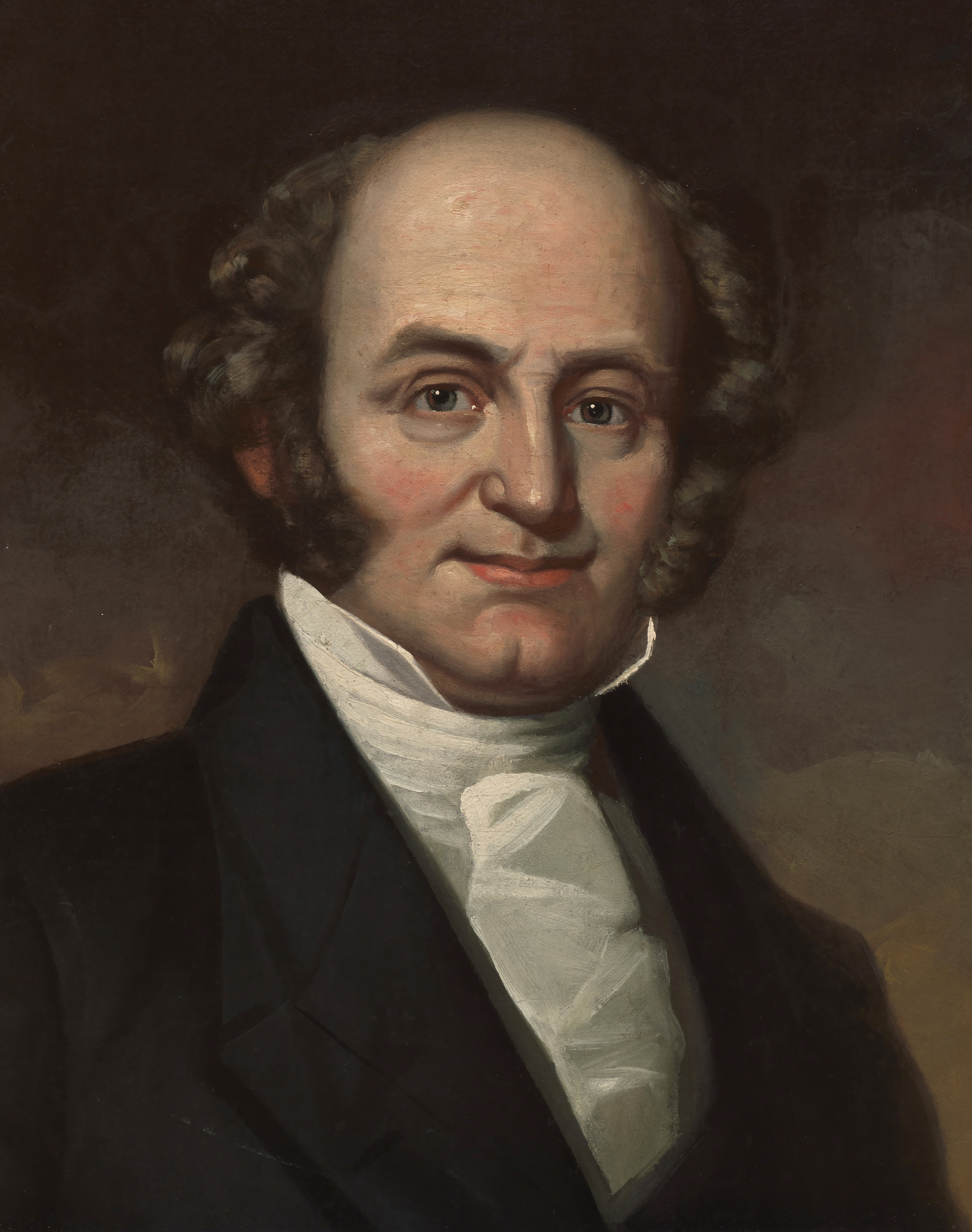
Martin Van Buren, the incumbent president in 1840, whose term expired on March 4, 1841

Democratic members of the New Hampshire General Court made a call for the 1840 Democratic National Convention which was held in Baltimore, Maryland in May 1840. Delegates from twenty-two states attended the convention, but the sizes of the delegations varied with New Jersey having fifty-nine delegates to cast its eight votes while Massachusetts only had one delegate to cast its fourteen votes.

A committee was formed to make recommendations for the nominations and the committee supported Van Buren for renomination which was approved by acclamation. However, the vice-presidential nomination was left vacant due to opposition to Vice President Richard Mentor Johnson's personal life.

=== Anti-Masonic Party nomination ===
After the negative views of Freemasonry among a large segment of the public began to wane in the mid-1830s, the Anti-Masonic Party disintegrated. Many leaders began to move to the Whig party. Remaining leaders met in September 1837 in Washington, and agreed to maintain the party. The third Anti-Masonic Party National Convention was held in Philadelphia on November 13–14, 1838. By this time, the party had been almost entirely supplanted by the Whigs. The delegates unanimously voted to nominate William Henry Harrison for president (who the party had supported for president the previous election along with Francis Granger for vice president) and Daniel Webster for vice president. However, when the Whig National Convention nominated Harrison with John Tyler as his running mate, the Anti-Masonic Party did not make an alternate nomination and ceased to function and was fully absorbed into the Whigs by 1840.

Convention vote
Presidential vote		Vice presidential vote	
William Henry Harrison	119	Daniel Webster	119

=== Liberty Party nomination ===
James G. Birney, Myron Holley, Joshua Leavitt, and Gerrit Smith proposed the creation of an anti-slavery party. In July 1839, two resolutions proposed by Holley at the American Anti-Slavery Society's meeting in Cleveland, called for the creation of an abolitionist party. They failed. Nevertheless, the supporters nominated Birney and Francis Julius LeMoyne as a presidential ticket at a meeting in Warsaw, New York. However, Birney declined the presidential nomination as he preferred a nomination to be made by a regular body of abolitionists and LeMoyne also declined the vice-presidential nomination. Smith and Holley made a call for an abolitionist nominating convention to be held on April 1, 1840, in Albany, New York. 121 delegates attended the delegation and selected a presidential ticket of Birney and Thomas Earle. which was accepted. It took the name Liberty Party.

Birney was unable to campaign during the election as he was in England until November. The Liberty Party received opposition from followers of William Lloyd Garrison and abolitionist Whigs. The Liberty Party received 7,453 votes.

== General election ==
=== Campaign ===
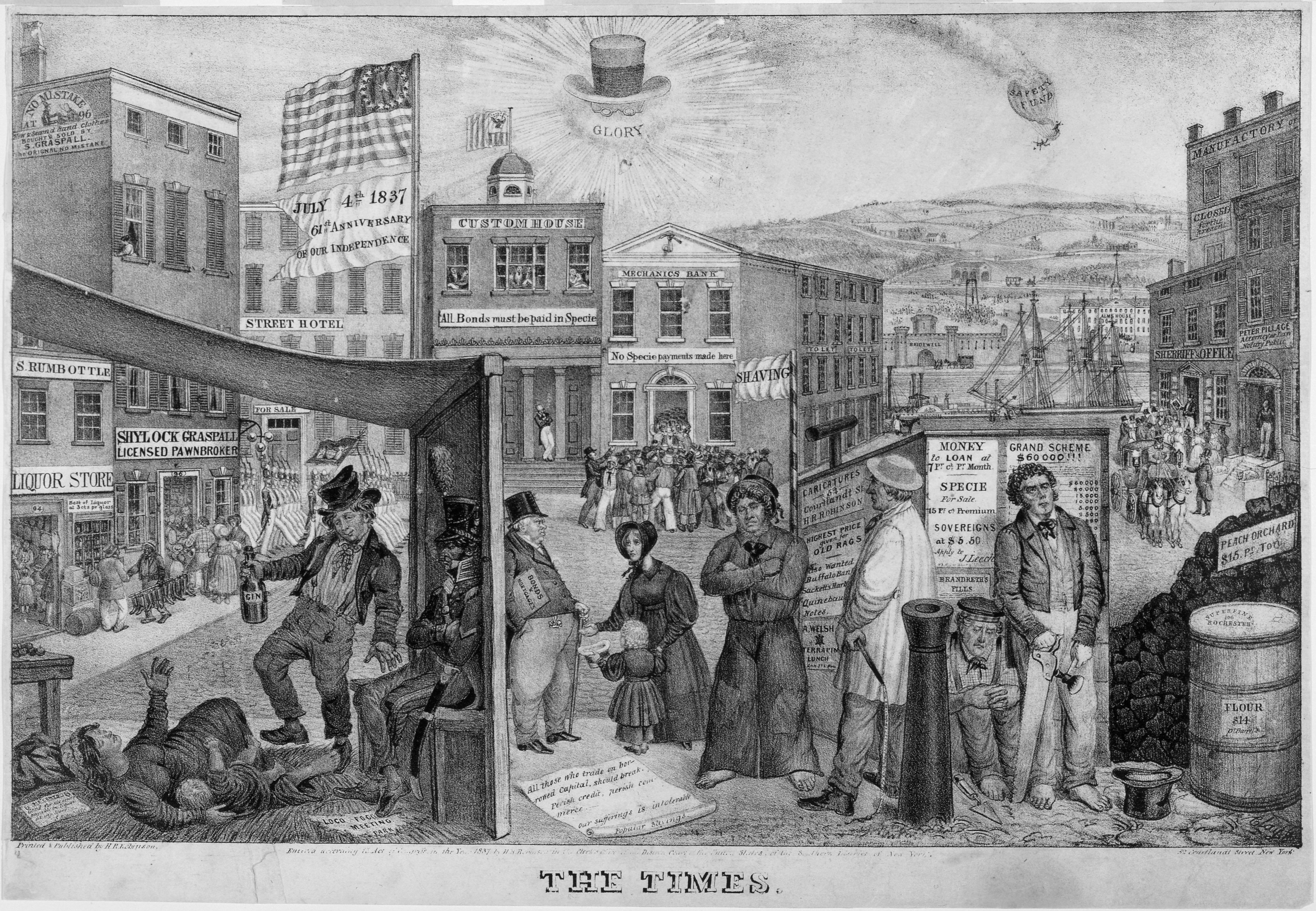
Caricature on the aftermath of the panic of 1837

In the wake of the Panic of 1837, Van Buren was widely unpopular, and Harrison, following Andrew Jackson's strategy, ran as a war hero and man of the people while presenting Van Buren as a wealthy snob living in luxury at the public expense. Although Harrison was comfortably wealthy and well educated, his "log cabin" image caught fire, sweeping all sections of the country.

Harrison avoided campaigning on the issues, with his Whig Party attracting a broad coalition with few common ideals. The Whig strategy overall was to win the election by avoiding discussion of difficult national issues such as slavery or the national bank and concentrate instead on exploiting dissatisfaction over the failed policies of the Van Buren administration with colorful campaigning techniques.

==== Log cabin campaign of William Henry Harrison ====
Harrison was the first president to campaign actively for office. He did so with the slogan "Tippecanoe and Tyler too". Tippecanoe referred to Harrison's military victory over a group of Shawnee Native Americans at a river in Indiana called Tippecanoe in 1811. For their part, Democrats laughed at Harrison for being too old for the presidency, and referred to him as "Granny", hinting that he was senile. Said one Democratic newspaper: "Give him a barrel of hard cider, and ... a pension of two thousand [dollars] a year ... and ... he will sit the remainder of his days in his log cabin."

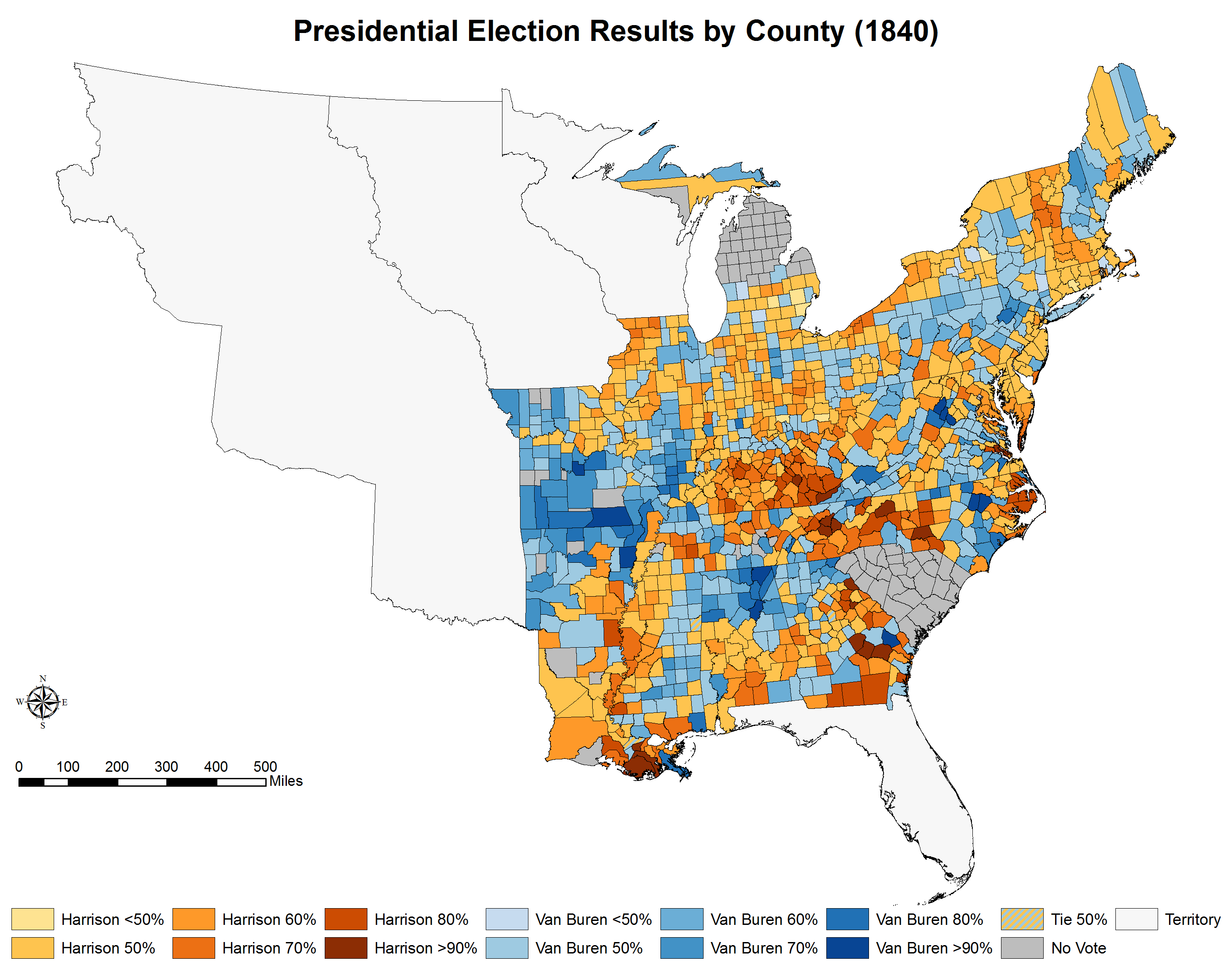
Results by county explicitly indicating the percentage of the winning candidate in each county. Shades of yellow are for Harrison (Whig) and shades of blue are for Van Buren (Democrat).

Whigs took advantage of this quip and declared that Harrison was "the log cabin and hard cider candidate", a man of the common people from the rough-and-tumble West. They depicted Harrison's opponent, President Martin Van Buren, as a wealthy snob who was out of touch with the people. In fact, it was Harrison who came from a family of wealthy planters, while Van Buren's father was a tavernkeeper. Harrison however moved to the frontier and for years lived in a log cabin, while Van Buren had been a well-paid government official.

Nonetheless, the election was held in the wake of the Panic of 1837, one of the worst economic depressions in the nation's history, and voters blamed Van Buren, seeing him as unsympathetic to struggling citizens. Harrison campaigned vigorously and won.

== Results ==
31.9% of the voting age population and 80.3% of eligible voters participated in the election. This was the first time that a majority of southern voters participated in the election. (A majority in the north had first participated in an election in 1828.)

Harrison won the support of western settlers and eastern bankers alike. Of the 1,179 counties/independent cities making returns, Harrison won in 699 (59.29%) while Van Buren carried 477 (40.46%). Three counties (0.25%) in the South split evenly between Harrison and Van Buren.

The extent of Van Buren's unpopularity was evident in Harrison's victories in New York, the president's home state, and in Tennessee, where Andrew Jackson himself had come out of retirement to stump for his former vice-president.

This was the first time a Democratic president lost re-election, as well as the first of only two times (the other being 1980) that a Democratic president lost re-election and lost the popular vote.

This was also the first election in U.S. history in which a candidate won more than a million popular votes.

This was the last election where Indiana voted for the Whigs. It was also the only election where the Whigs won Maine, Michigan, and Mississippi. The election was also the last time that a majority of voters in Mississippi voted against the Democrats until 1872, the last in which a majority of voters in Indiana voted against Democrats until 1860, and the last in which a majority of voters in Maine and Michigan voted against Democrats until 1856. This is the only election in American history in which a majority of voters in Alabama and a majority of voters in Mississippi voted for different candidates.

The 1840 presidential election was the only time in which four people who either had been or would become a U.S. President (Van Buren, Harrison, Tyler, and Polk) received at least one vote in the Electoral College when it voted for president and vice-president.

Harrison's victory won him precious little time as chief executive of the United States. After giving the longest inauguration speech in U.S. history (lasting about 1 hour and 45 minutes, in cold weather and rain), Harrison served only one month as president before dying of pneumonia on April 4, 1841.

Electoral results
Presidential candidate	Party	Home state	Popular vote^{(a)}		Electoral vote	Running mate		
Presidential candidate	Party	Home state	Count	Percentage	Electoral vote	Vice-presidential candidate	Home state	Electoral vote
William Henry Harrison	Whig	Ohio	1,275,583	52.87%	234	John Tyler	Virginia	234
Martin Van Buren (incumbent)	Democratic	New York	1,129,645	46.82%	60	Richard Mentor Johnson (incumbent)	Kentucky	48
Martin Van Buren (incumbent)	Democratic	New York	1,129,645	46.82%	60	Littleton W. Tazewell	Virginia	11
Martin Van Buren (incumbent)	Democratic	New York	1,129,645	46.82%	60	James K. Polk	Tennessee	1
James G. Birney	Liberty	New York	7,453	0.31%	0	Thomas Earle	Pennsylvania	0
Other			13	0.00%	—	Other		—
Total			2,412,694	100%	294			294
Needed to win					148			148

Source (Popular Vote): Leip, David. "1840 Presidential Election Results". Dave Leip's Atlas of U.S. Presidential Elections. Source (Electoral Vote): "Electoral College Box Scores 1789–1996". National Archives and Records Administration.

^{(a)} The popular vote figures exclude South Carolina where the Electors were chosen by the state legislature rather than by popular vote.

Popular vote
Harrison	52.88%
Van Buren	46.81%
Others	0.31%

Electoral vote
Harrison	79.59%
Van Buren	20.41%

=== Geography of results ===
==== Cartographic gallery ====
Electoral College map (president)

Electoral College map (vice president)

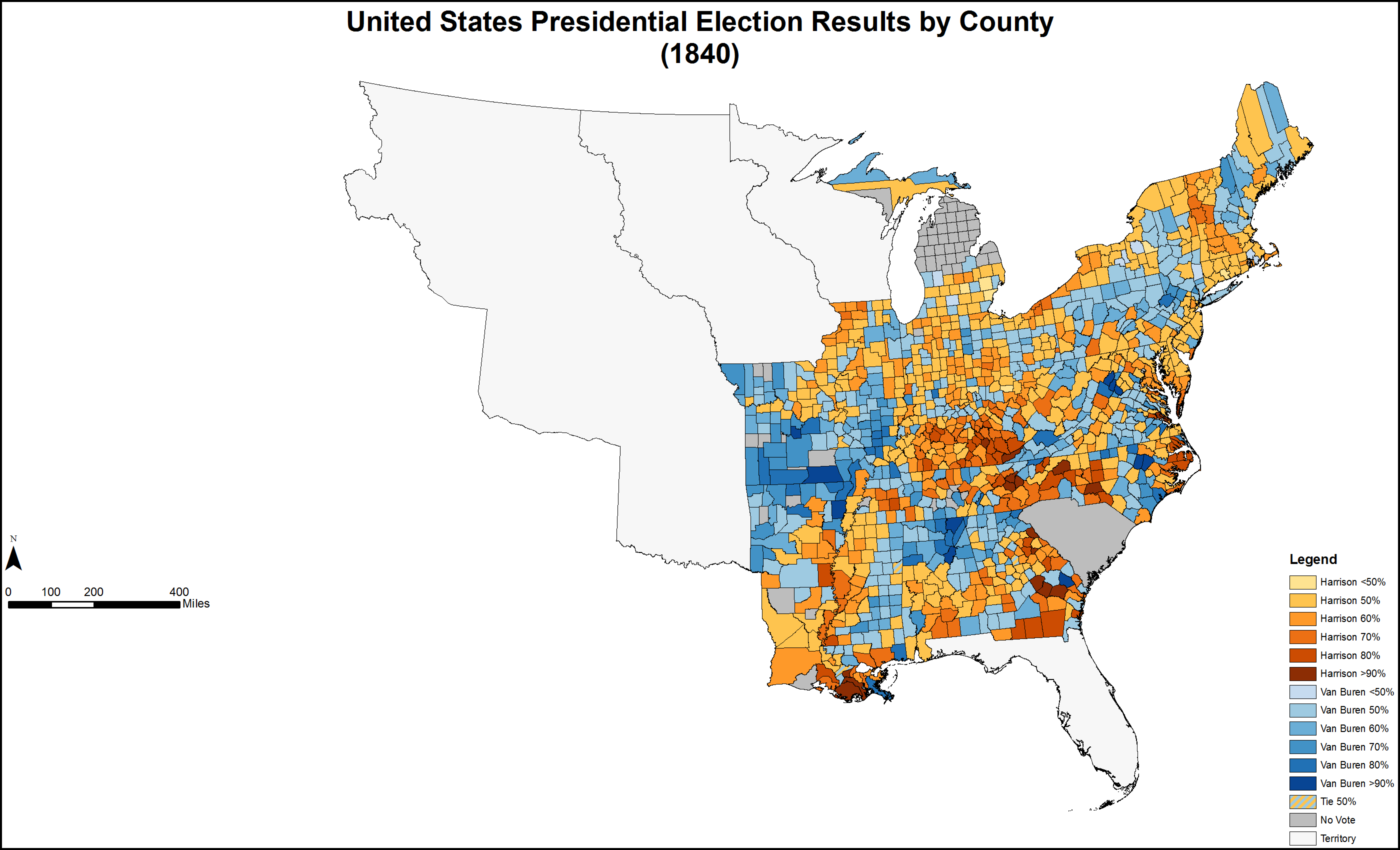
Map of presidential election results by county

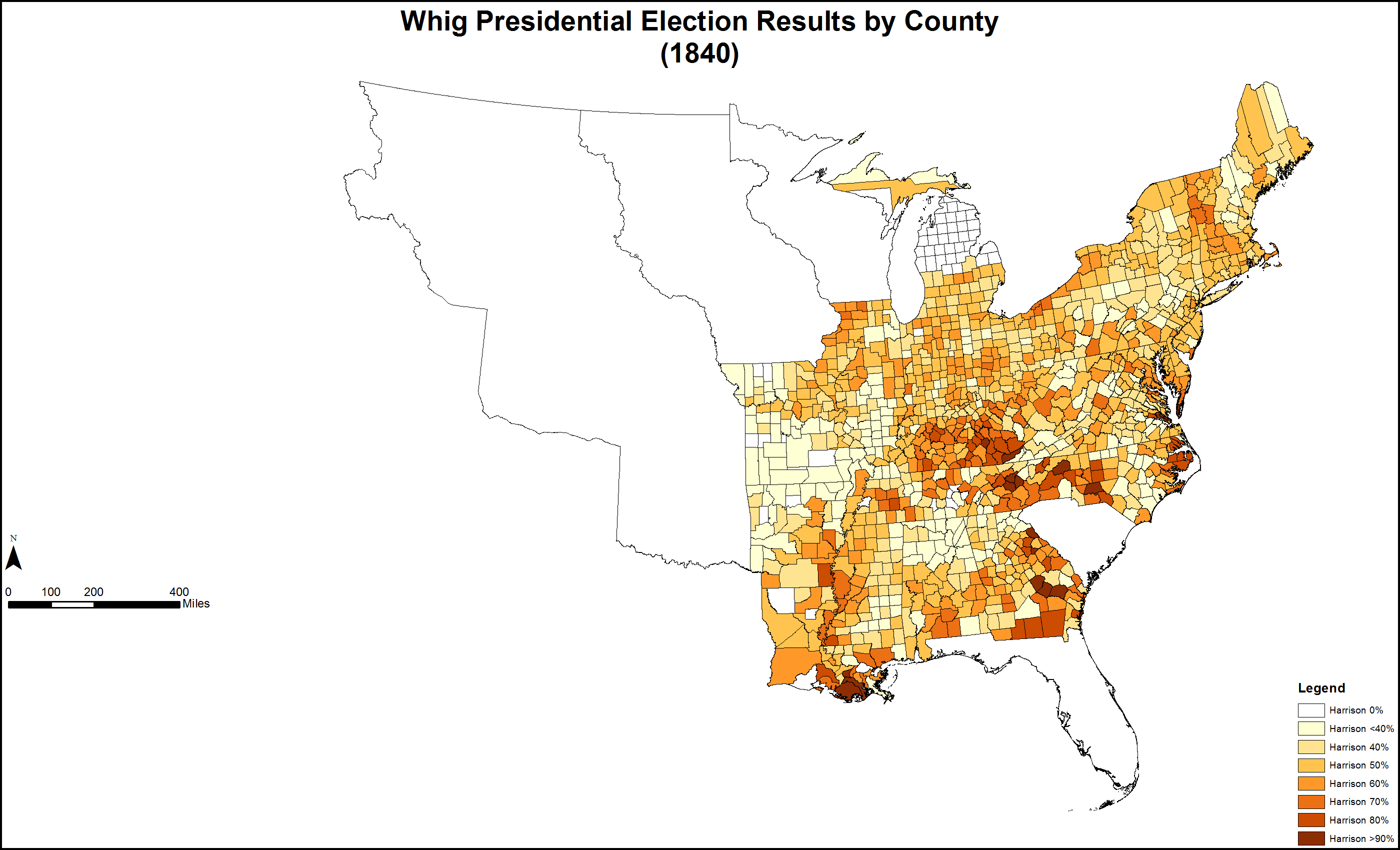
Map of Whig presidential election results by county

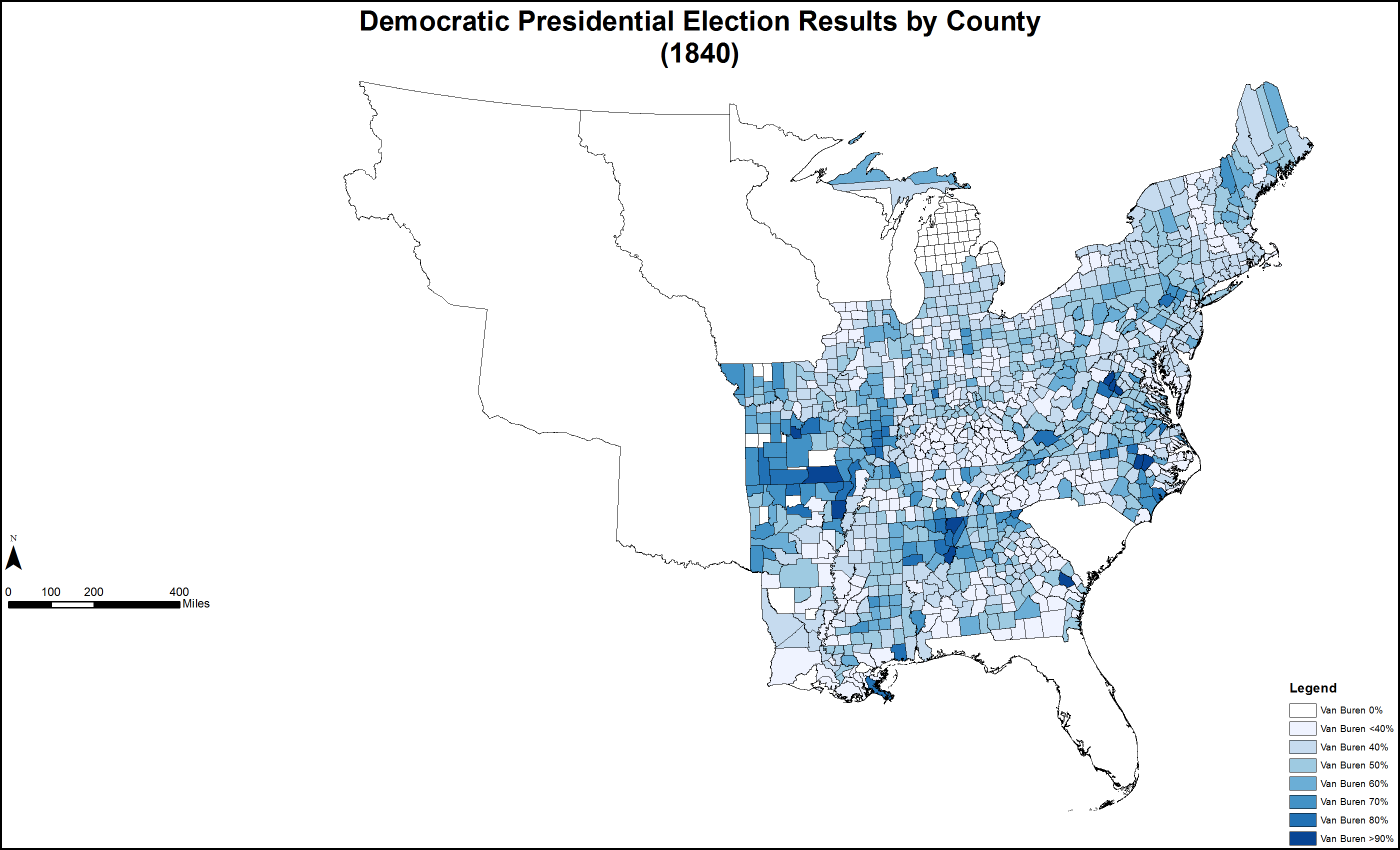
Map of Democratic presidential election results by county

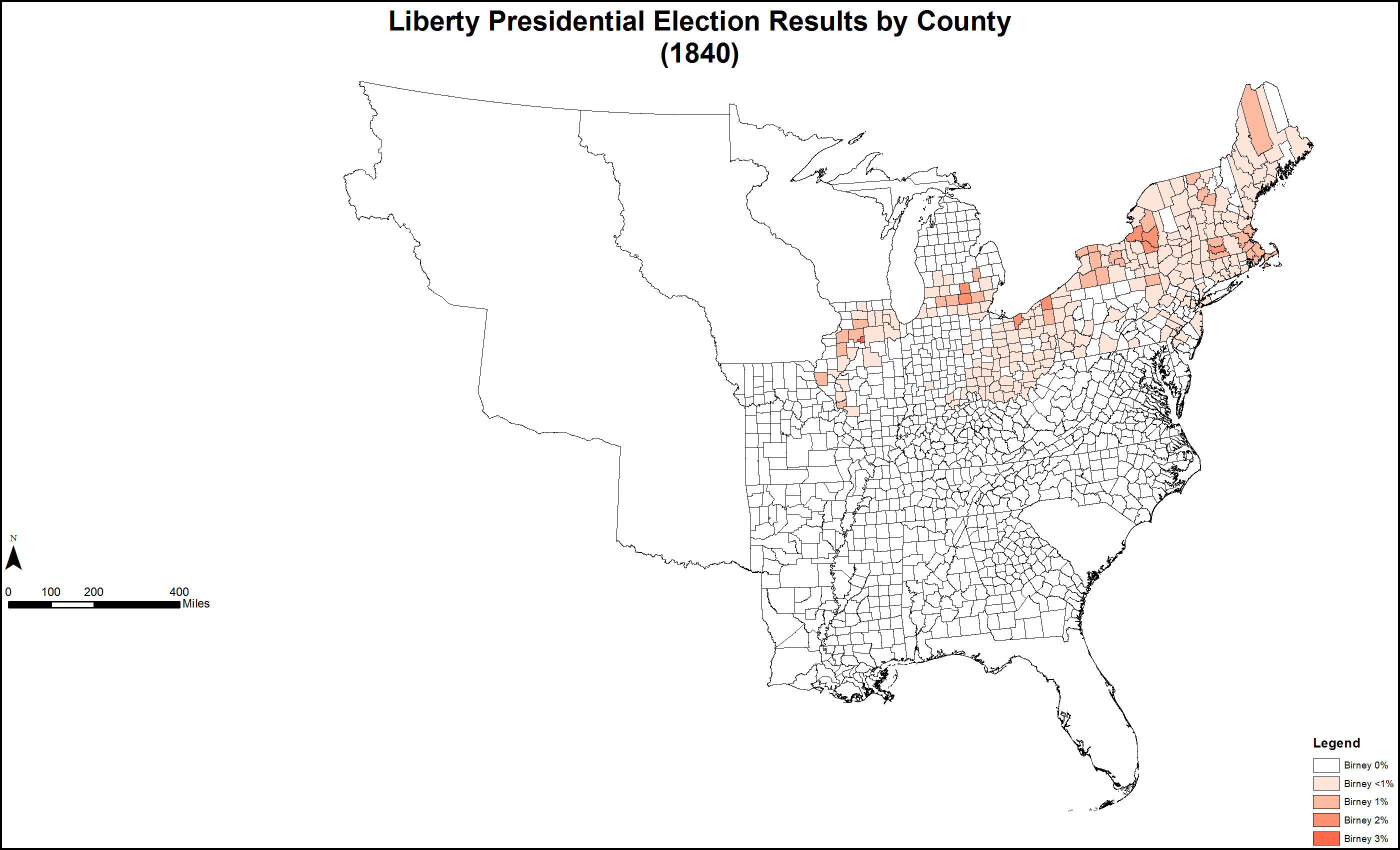
Map of Liberty presidential election results by county

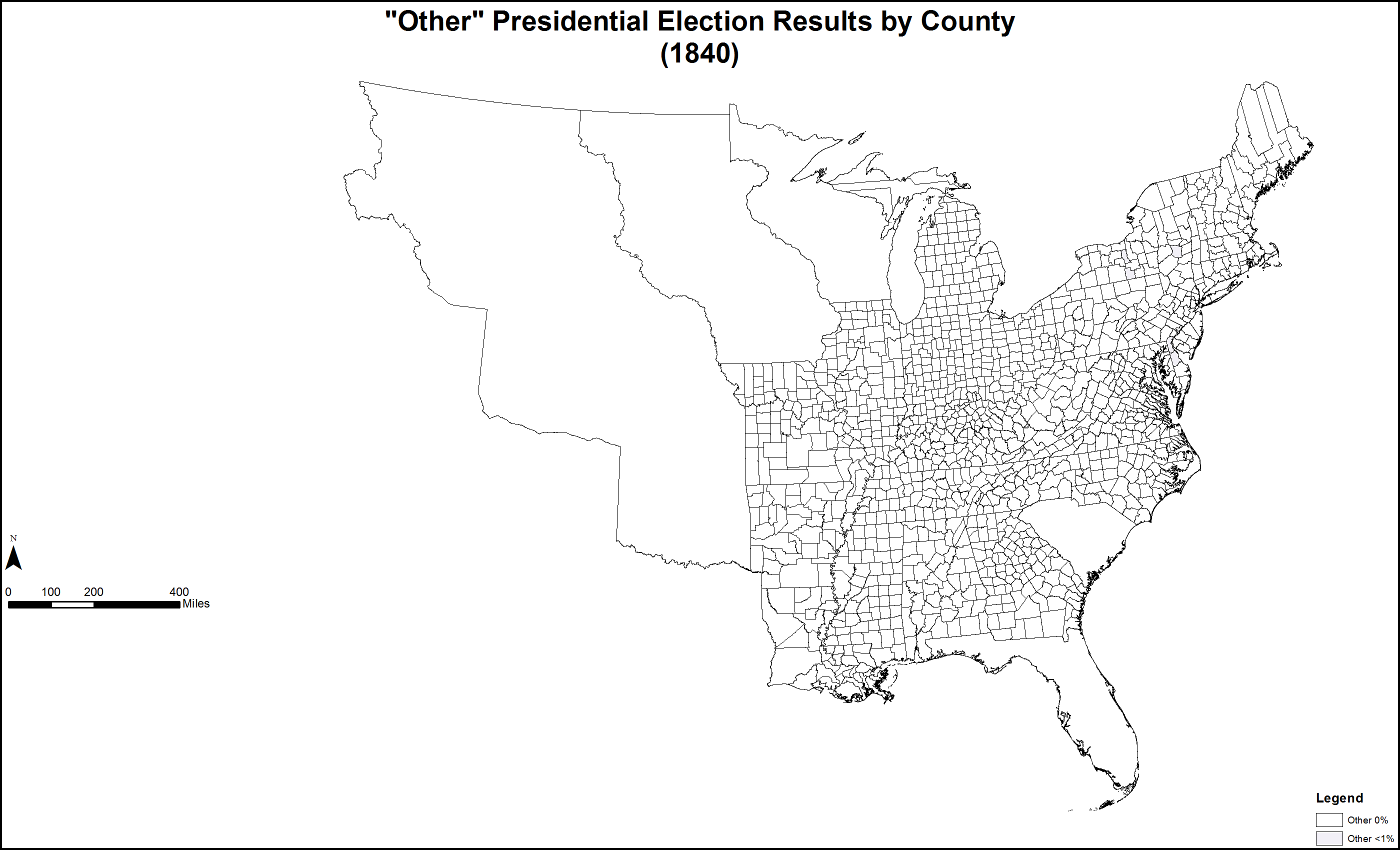
Map of "Other" presidential election results by county

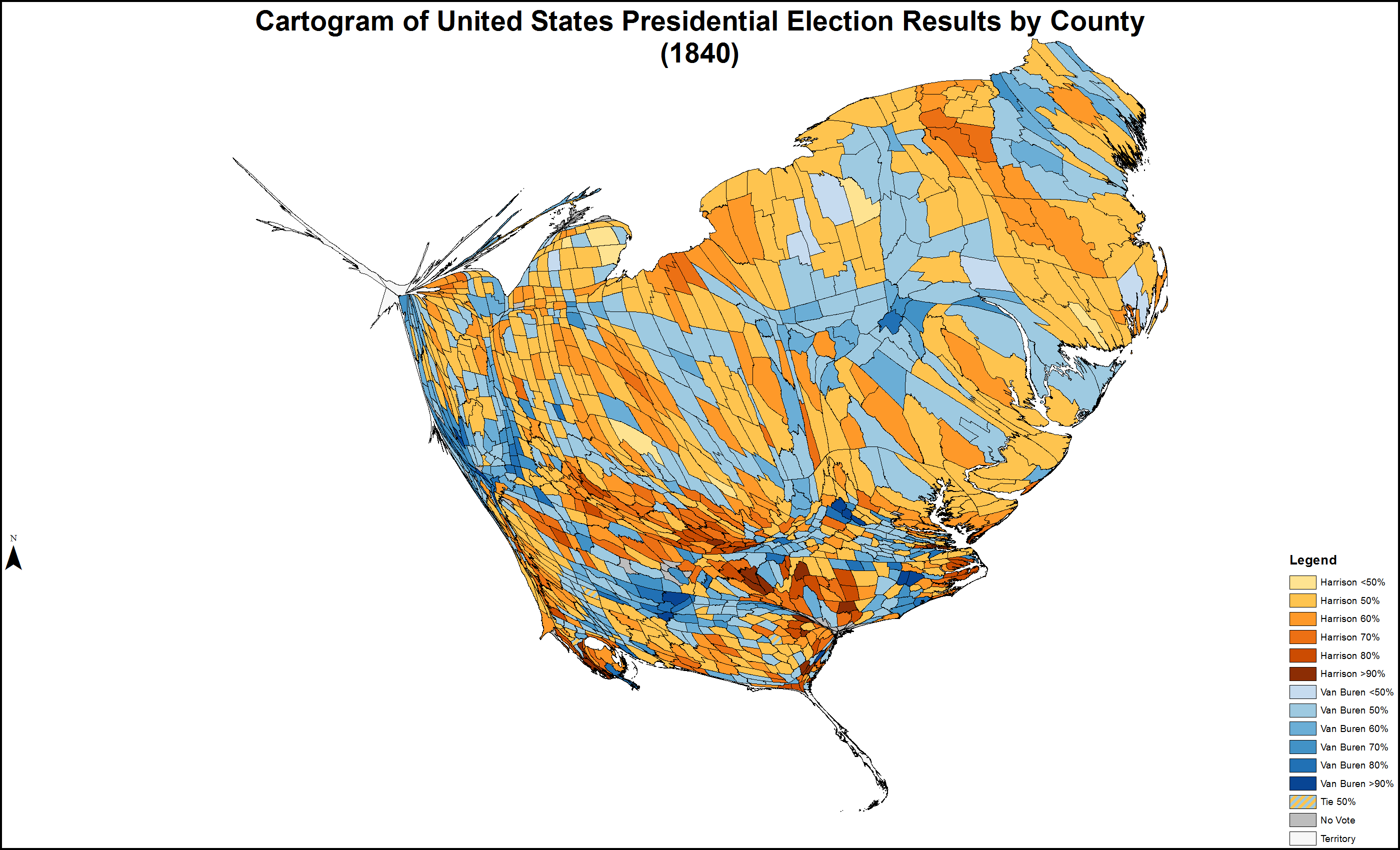
Cartogram of presidential election results by county

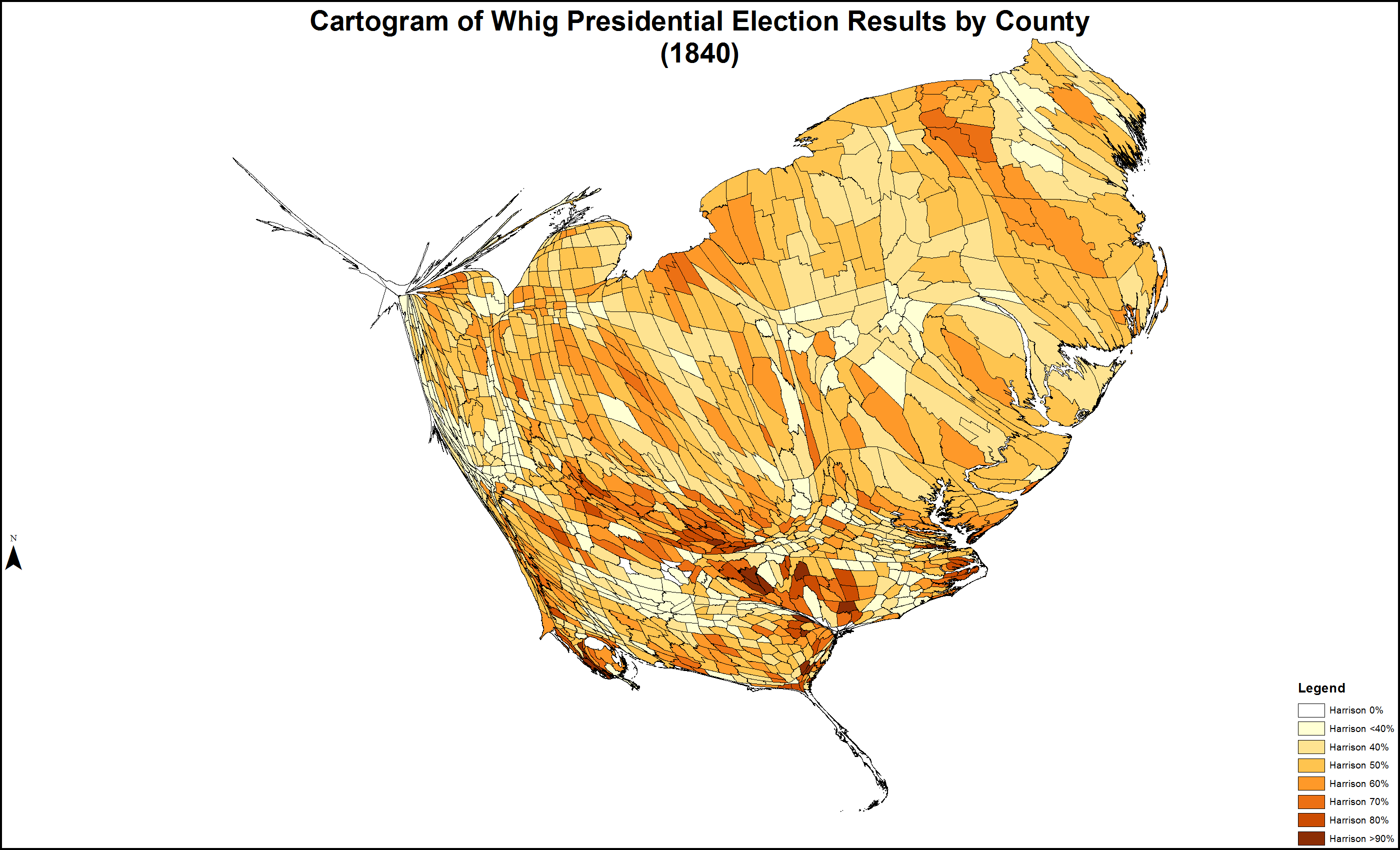
Cartogram of Whig presidential election results by county

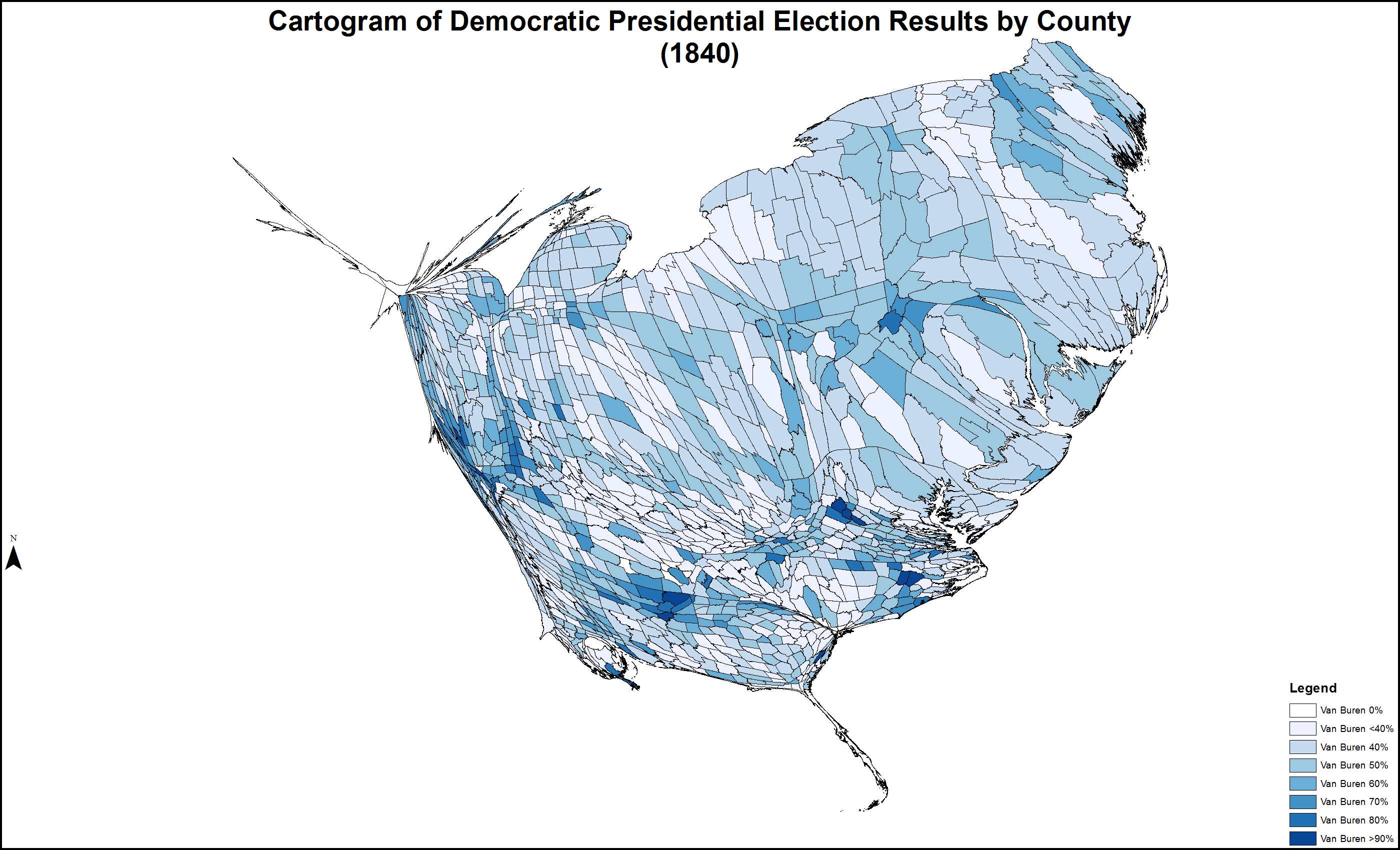
Cartogram of Democratic presidential election results by county

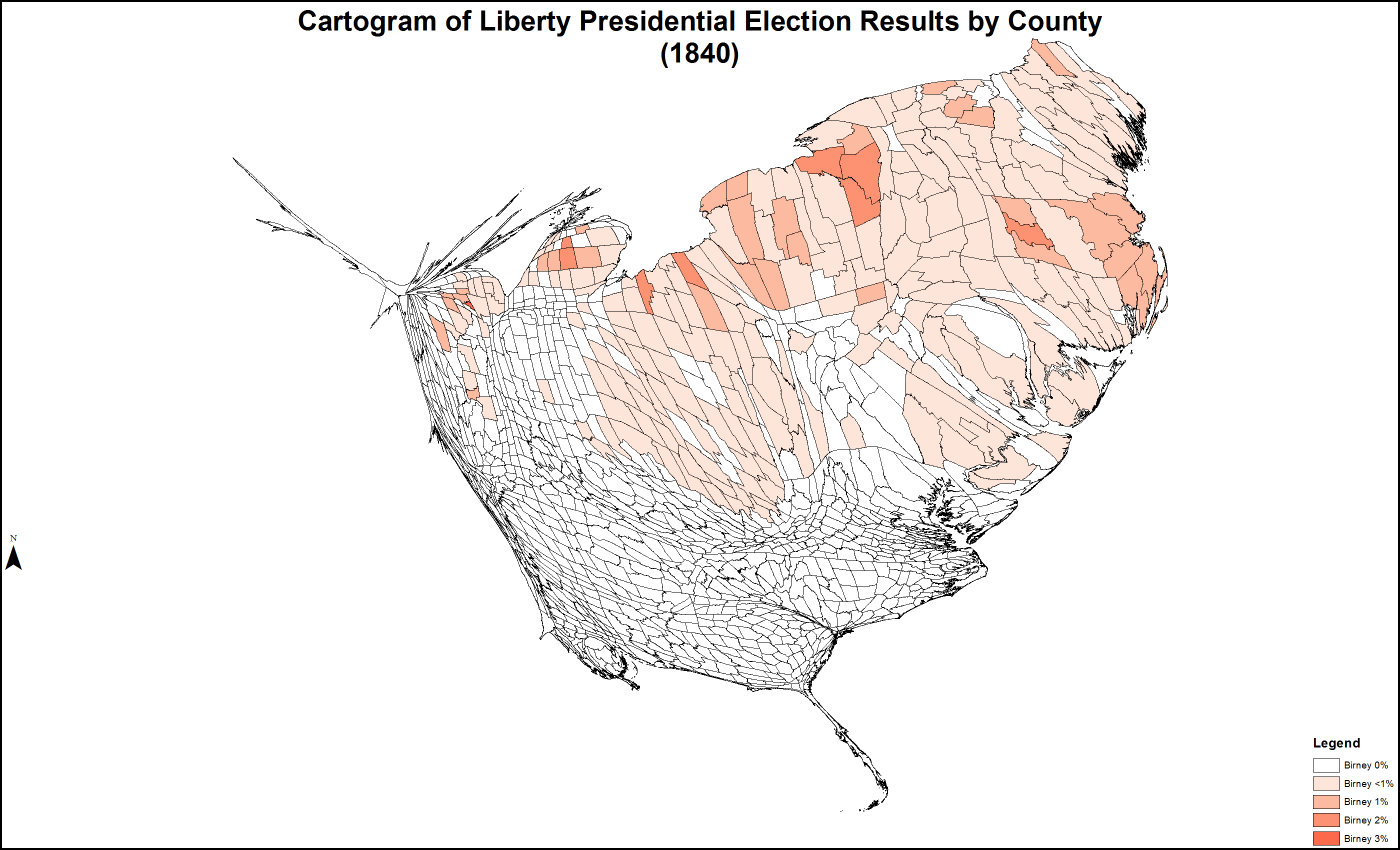
Cartogram of Liberty presidential election results by county

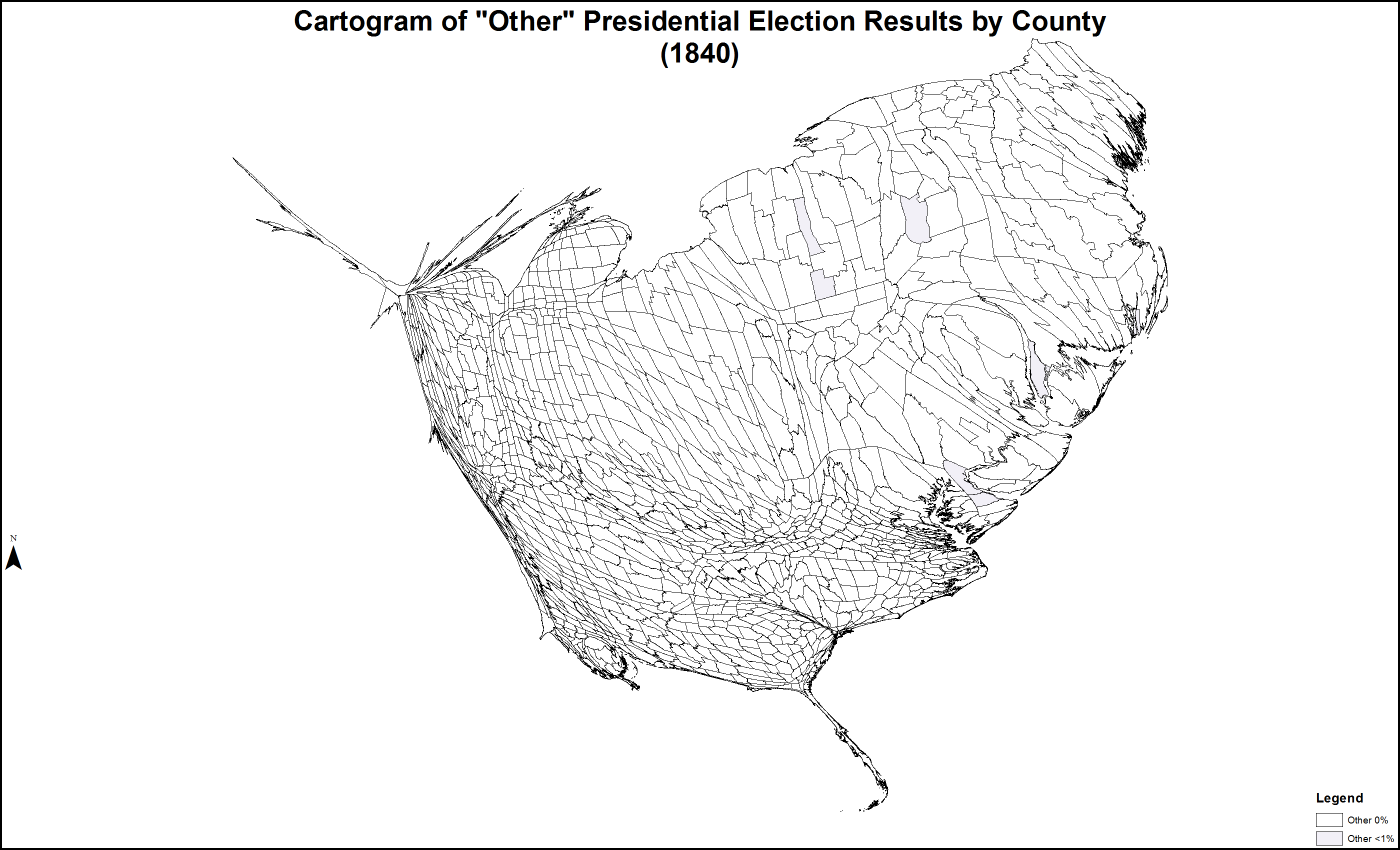
Cartogram of "Other" presidential election results by county

=== Results by state ===
Source: Data from Walter Dean Burnham, Presidential ballots, 1836–1892 (Johns Hopkins University Press, 1955) pp 247–257.

States/districts won by Van Buren
States/districts won by Harrison/Tyler

		William Henry Harrison Whig			Martin Van Buren Democratic			James G. Birney Liberty			Margin		State Total	
State	electoral votes	#	%	electoral votes	#	%	electoral votes	#	%	electoral votes	#	%	#	
Alabama	7	28,515	45.62	-	33,996	54.38	7	no ballots			-5,481	-8.76	62,511	AL
Arkansas	3	5,160	43.58	-	6,679	56.42	3	no ballots			-1,519	-12.84	11,839	AR
Connecticut	8	31,598	55.55	8	25,281	44.45	-	no ballots			6,317	11.10	56,879	CT
Delaware	3	5,967	54.99	3	4,872	44.89	-	no ballots			1,095	10.10	10,852	DE
Georgia	11	40,339	55.78	11	31,983	44.22	-	no ballots			8,356	11.56	72,322	GA
Illinois	5	45,574	48.91	-	47,441	50.92	5	160	0.17	-	-1,867	-2.01	93,175	IL
Indiana	9	65,302	55.86	9	51,604	44.14	-	no ballots			13,698	11.72	116,906	IN
Kentucky	15	58,488	64.20	15	32,616	35.80	-	no ballots			25,872	28.40	91,104	KY
Louisiana	5	11,296	59.73	5	7,616	40.27	-	no ballots			3,680	19.46	18,912	LA
Maine	10	46,612	50.23	10	46,190	49.77	-	no ballots			422	0.46	92,802	ME
Maryland	10	33,528	53.83	10	28,752	46.17	-	no ballots			4,776	7.66	62,280	MD
Massachusetts	14	72,852	57.44	14	52,355	41.28	-	1,618	1.28	-	20,497	16.16	126,825	MA
Michigan	3	22,933	51.71	3	21,096	47.57	-	321	0.72	-	1,837	4.14	44,350	MI
Mississippi	4	19,515	53.43	4	17,010	46.57	-	no ballots			2,505	6.86	36,525	MS
Missouri	4	22,954	43.37	-	29,969	56.63	4	no ballots			-7,015	-13.26	52,923	MO
New Hampshire	7	26,310	43.88	-	32,774	54.66	7	872	1.45	-	-6,464	-10.78	59,956	NH
New Jersey	8	33,351	51.74	8	31,034	48.15	-	69	0.11	-	2,317	3.59	64,454	NJ
New York	42	226,001	51.18	42	212,733	48.18	-	2,809	0.64	-	13,268	3.00	441,543	NY
North Carolina	15	46,567	57.68	15	34,168	42.32	-	no ballots			12,399	15.36	80,735	NC
Ohio	21	148,157	54.10	21	124,782	45.57	-	903	0.33	-	23,375	8.53	273,842	OH
Pennsylvania	30	144,010	50.00	30	143,676	49.88	-	340	0.12	-	334	0.12	288,026	PA
Rhode Island	4	5,278	61.22	4	3,301	38.29	-	42	0.49	-	1,977	22.93	8,621	RI
South Carolina	11	no popular vote			no popular vote		11	no popular vote			-	-	-	SC
Tennessee	15	60,194	55.66	15	47,951	44.34	-	no ballots			12,243	11.32	108,145	TN
Vermont	7	32,445	63.90	7	18,009	35.47	-	319	0.63	-	14,436	28.43	50,773	VT
Virginia	23	42,639	49.35	-	43,757	50.65	23	no ballots			-1,120	-1.30	86,394	VA
TOTALS:	294	1,275,585	52.87	234	1,129,645	46.82	60	7,453	0.31	-	145,938	6.05	2,412,694	US
TO WIN:	148													

==== States that flipped from Democratic to Whig ====
- Connecticut
- Louisiana
- Maine
- Michigan
- Mississippi
- New York
- North Carolina
- Pennsylvania
- Rhode Island

==== States that flipped from Whig to Democratic ====
- South Carolina

==== Close states ====
States where the margin of victory was under 1%:

1. Pennsylvania 0.12% (334 votes)
2. Maine 0.46% (422 votes)

States where the margin of victory was under 5%:

1. Virginia 1.3% (1,120 votes)
2. Illinois 2.01% (1,867 votes)
3. New York 3.0% (13,268 votes)
4. New Jersey 3.59% (2,317 votes) (tipping point state)
5. Michigan 4.14% (1,837 votes)

States where the margin of victory was under 10%:

1. Mississippi 6.86% (2,505 votes)
2. Maryland 7.66% (4,776 votes)
3. Ohio 8.53% (23,375 votes)
4. Alabama 8.76% (5,481 votes)

==== Method of Electoral college selection ====
Method of choosing electors	State(s)
Each Elector appointed by state legislature	South Carolina
State's electors chosen as general ticket by plurality of voters statewide	The other 25

== Campaign songs/slogans ==
=== Harrison ===
"Tippecanoe and Tyler too"

Abbreviated version
First verse and chorus.

Full version
All twelve verses.

=== Van Buren ===
Rockabye, baby, Daddy's a Whig
When he comes home, hard cider he'll swig
When he has swug
He'll fall in a stu
And down will come Tyler and Tippecanoe.

Rockabye, baby, when you awake
You will discover Tip is a fake.
Far from the battle, war cry and drum
He sits in his cabin a'drinking bad rum.

Rockabye, baby, never you cry
You need not fear of Tip and his Ty.
What they would ruin, Van Buren will fix.
Van's a magician, they are but tricks.

== Election paraphernalia and history ==
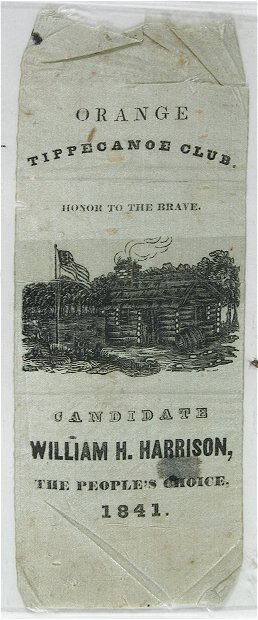
Harrison "Tippecanoe Club" ribbon

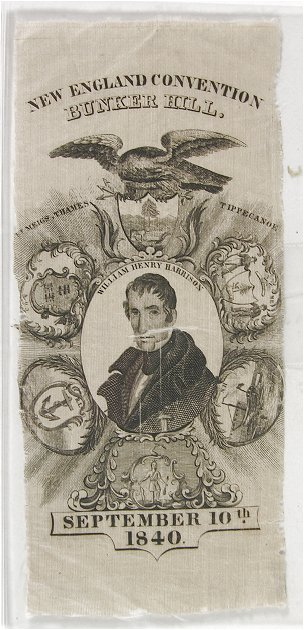
Ribbon for Harrison political rally

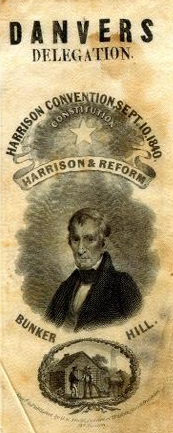
Ribbon for Danvers, Mass. delegation to Harrison Rally, Bunker Hill, 1840; engraved by George Girdler Smith

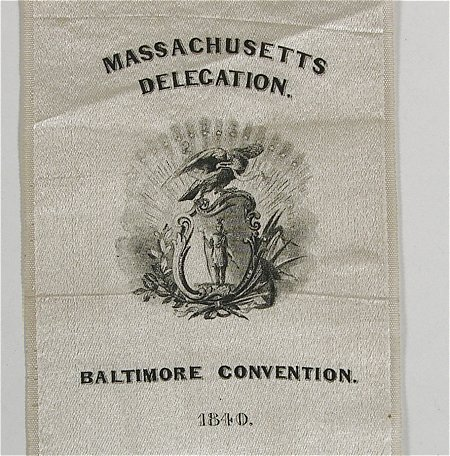
Delegate badge, Democratic convention

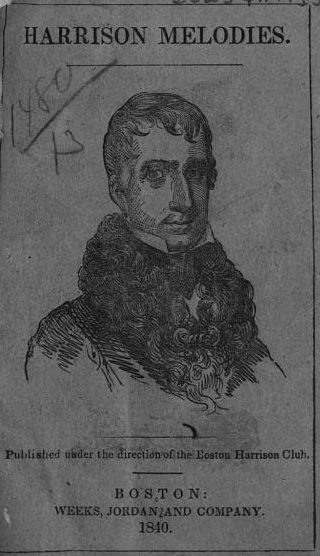
Cover of Boston Harrison Club's Harrison Melodies, 1840

In the 1997 film Amistad, Van Buren (played by Nigel Hawthorne) is seen campaigning for re-election. These scenes have been criticized for their historical inaccuracy.

== See also ==
- 1840–1841 United States House of Representatives elections
- 1840–1841 United States Senate elections
- History of the United States (1789–1849)
- Second Party System

== Works cited ==
- Abramson, Paul; Aldrich, John; Rohde, David (1995). Change and Continuity in the 1992 Elections. CQ Press. ISBN 0871878399.
- Black, Earl; Black, Merle (1992). The Vital South: How Presidents Are Elected. Harvard University Press. ISBN 0674941306.
