= 1840 Democratic National Convention =

U.S. political event held in Baltimore, Maryland

- 1840 presidential election
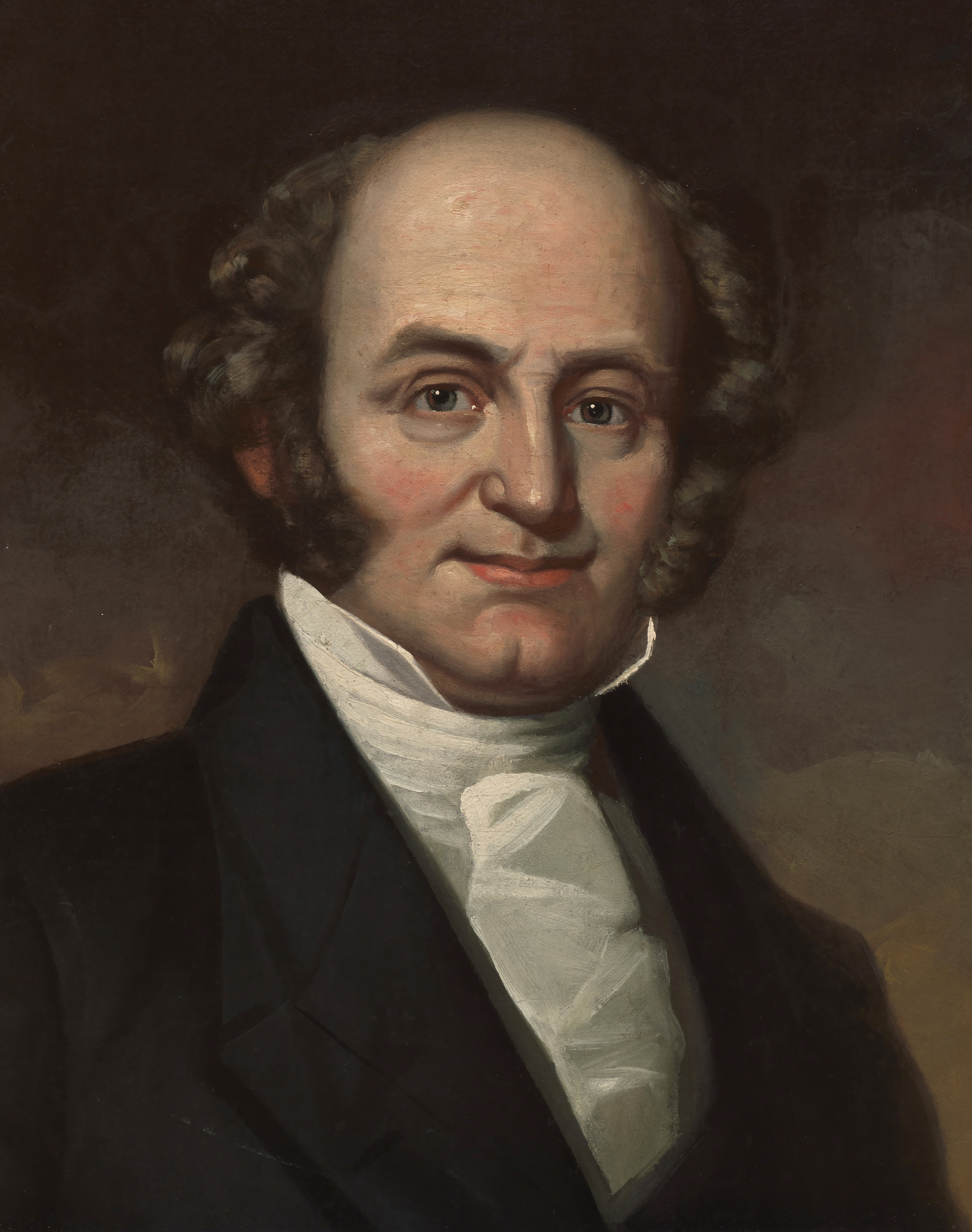
- Nominees; Van Buren and None

Convention
- Date(s): May 5–6, 1840
- City: Baltimore, Maryland
- Venue: The Assembly Rooms

Candidates
- Presidential nominee: Martin Van Buren of New York
- Vice-presidential nominee: None

The 1840 Democratic National Convention was held in Baltimore, Maryland, from May 5 to May 6. The Democratic Party re-nominated President Martin Van Buren by acclamation, but failed to select a nominee for vice president. Van Buren is the only major party presidential nominee since the ratification of the Twelfth Amendment to seek election without a running mate. Dragged down by the unpopularity of the Panic of 1837, Van Buren was defeated by the Whig Party's ticket in the 1840 presidential election.

== Delegates ==
Delegates from 21 of 26 states were in attendance. States not in attendance were Connecticut, Delaware, Illinois, South Carolina and Virginia.

== Platform ==
The 1840 convention was the first at which the party adopted a platform. Delegates reaffirmed their belief that the Constitution was the primary guide for each state's political affairs. To them, this meant that all roles of the federal government not specifically defined fell to each respective state government, including such responsibilities as debt created by local projects. Decentralized power and states' rights pervaded each and every resolution adopted at the convention, including those on slavery, taxes, and the possibility of a central bank. Regarding slavery, the Convention adopted the following resolution:

Resolved, That congress has no power under the Constitution, to interfere with or control the domestic institutions of the several states, and that such states are the sole and proper judges of every thing appertaining to their own affairs, not prohibited by the Constitution: that all efforts of the abolitionists or others, made to induce congress to interfere with questions of slavery, or to take incipient steps in relation thereto, are calculated to lead to the most alarming and dangerous consequences, and that all such efforts have an inevitable tendency to diminish the happiness of the people, and endanger the stability and permanency of the Union, and ought not to be countenanced by any friend to our political institutions.

== Vice presidential nomination ==
=== Candidates ===
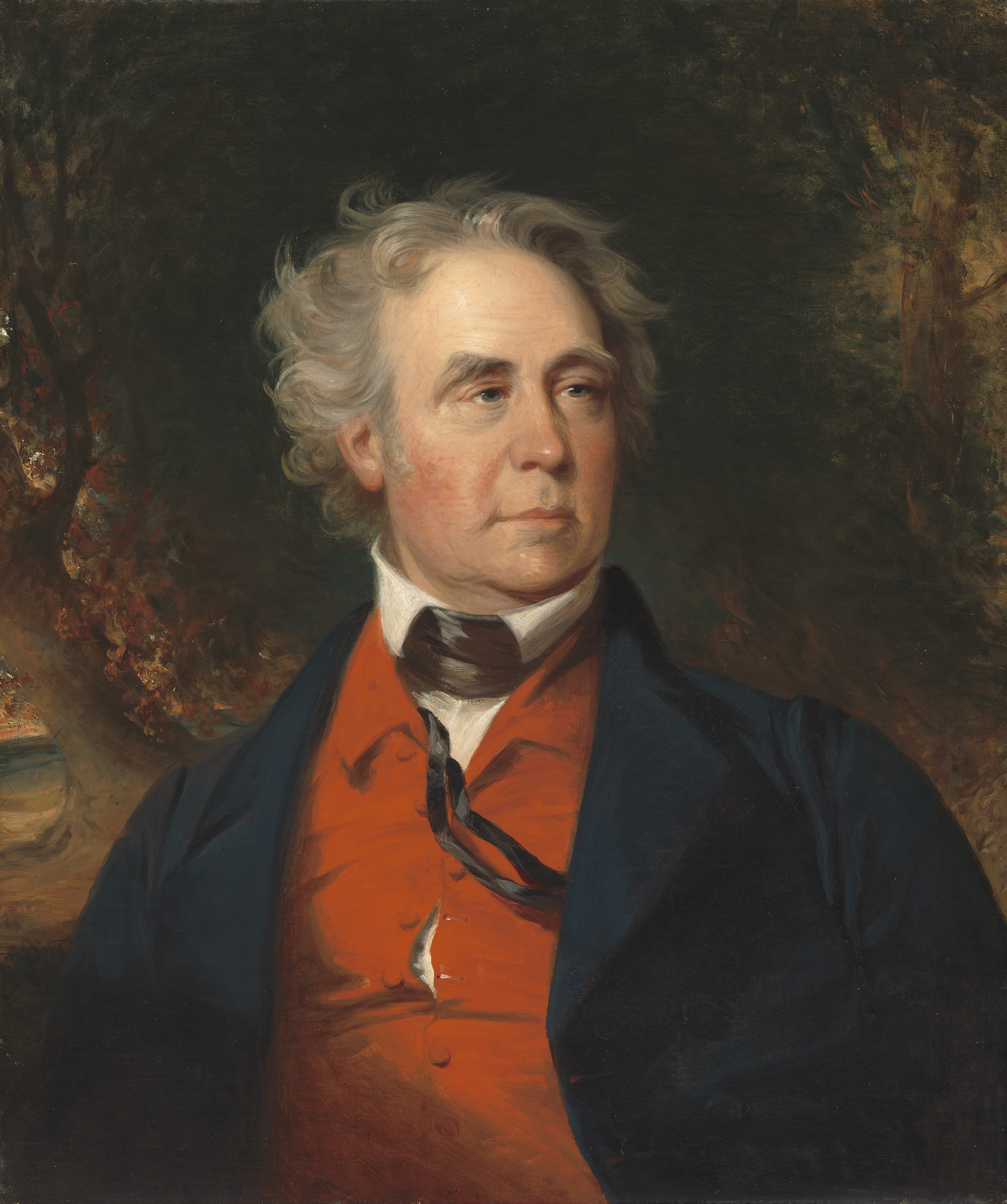
Vice President
Richard M. Johnson
of Kentucky

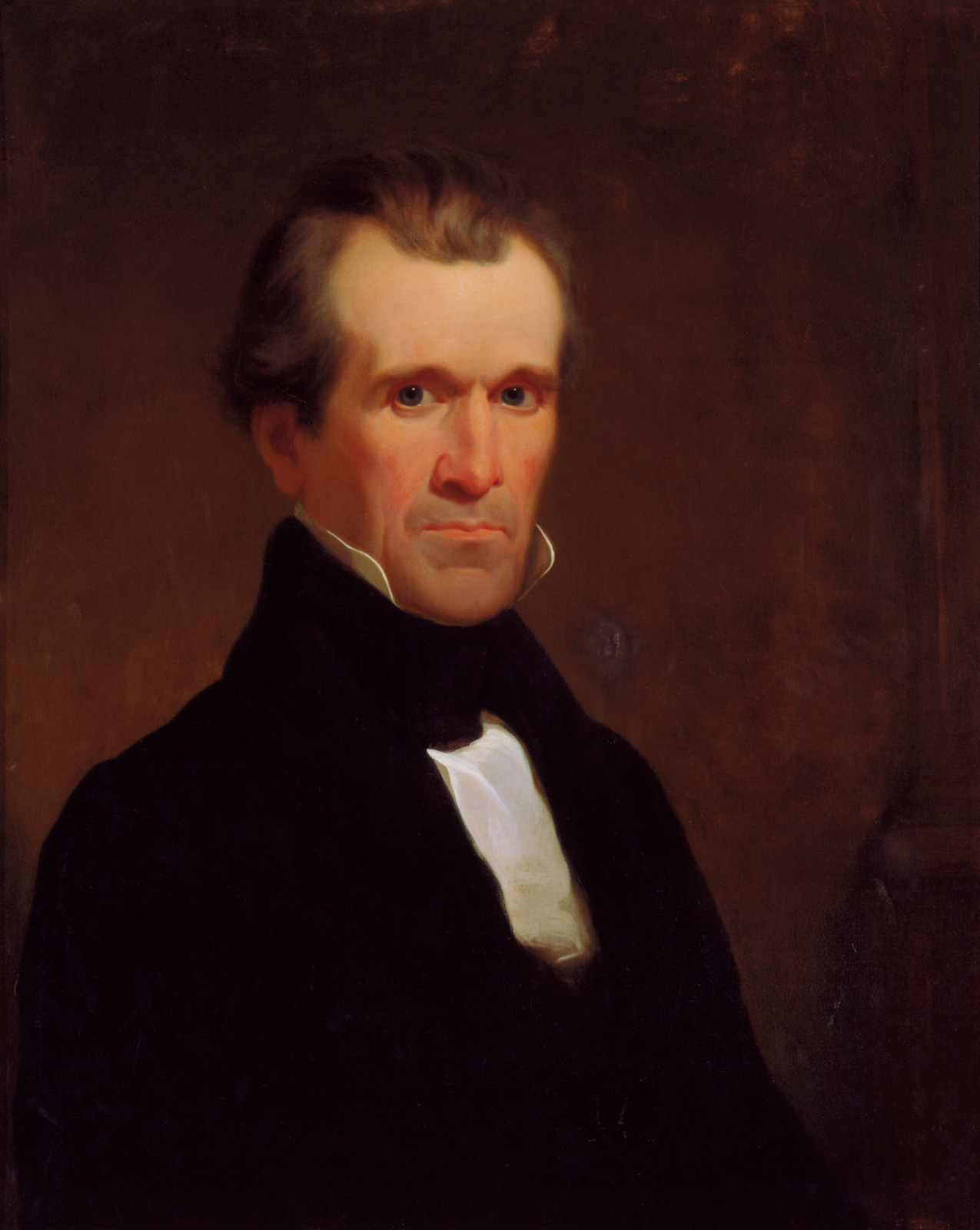
Governor
James K. Polk
of Tennessee

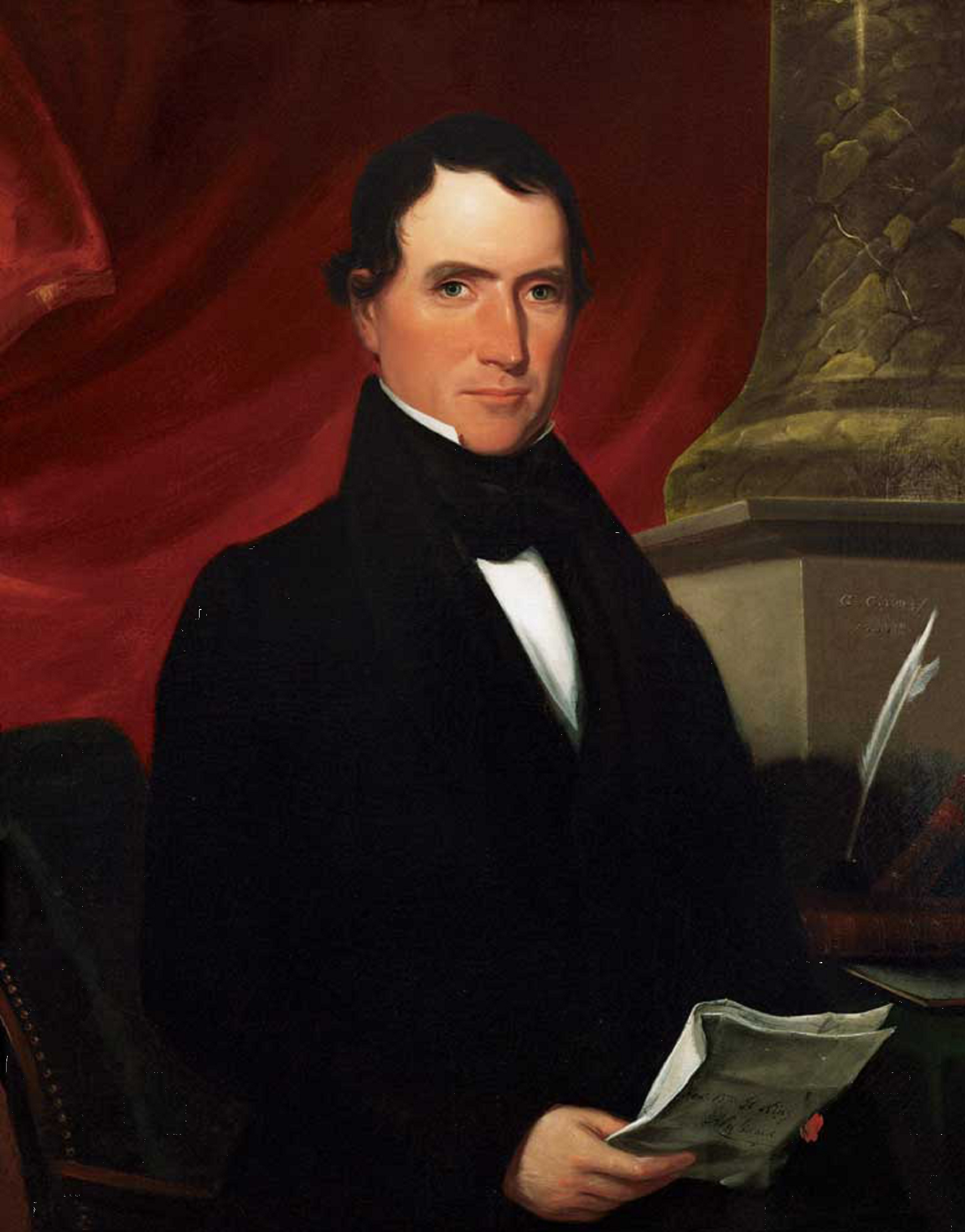
Senator
William R. King
of Alabama

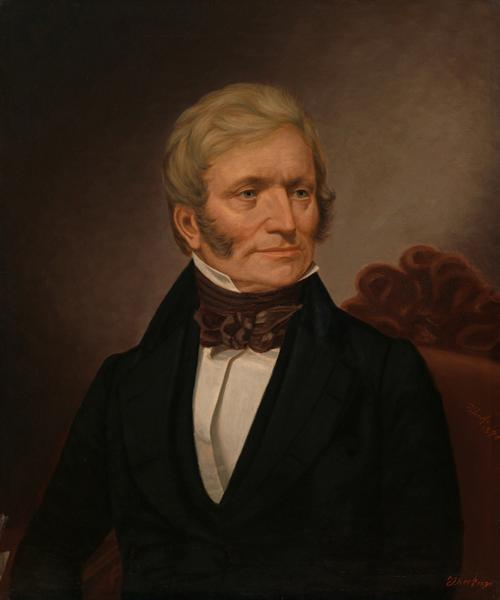
Secretary of State
John Forsyth
of Georgia

Vice President Richard M. Johnson was not retained on the ticket, as he was largely seen as a liability in the 1836 election and had focused much of his time as vice president on his own economic affairs. Former president Andrew Jackson backed James K. Polk for the position of vice president, but Van Buren supported his vice president's renomination. Prior to the convention, several prominent Democrats sought the vice presidential nomination. Among them were Polk; Senator William R. King of Alabama; and Secretary of State John Forsyth of Georgia. The convention ultimately failed to nominate a running mate for Van Buren. Van Buren remains the only major party presidential nominee since the passage of the Twelfth Amendment to seek election without a running mate. Polk, Johnson, and Littleton Tazewell would all receive electoral votes for vice president in the general election.

== See also ==
- History of the United States Democratic Party
- 1839 Whig National Convention
- 1840 United States presidential election
- U.S. presidential nomination convention
- List of Democratic National Conventions

Preceded by 1835; Baltimore, Maryland	Democratic National Conventions	Succeeded by 1844; Baltimore, Maryland
