= 1840 United States presidential election in Delaware =

- November 10, 1840
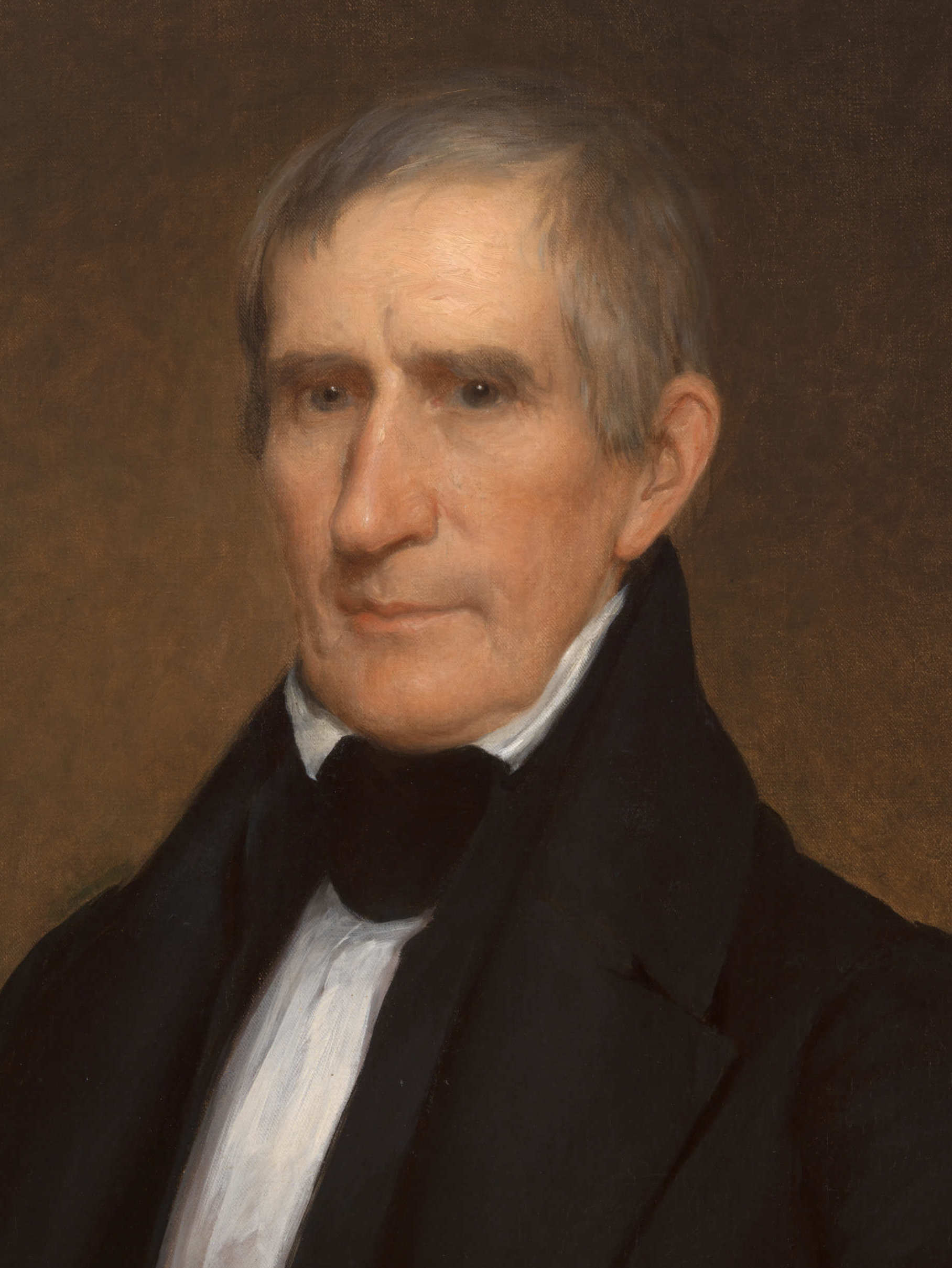

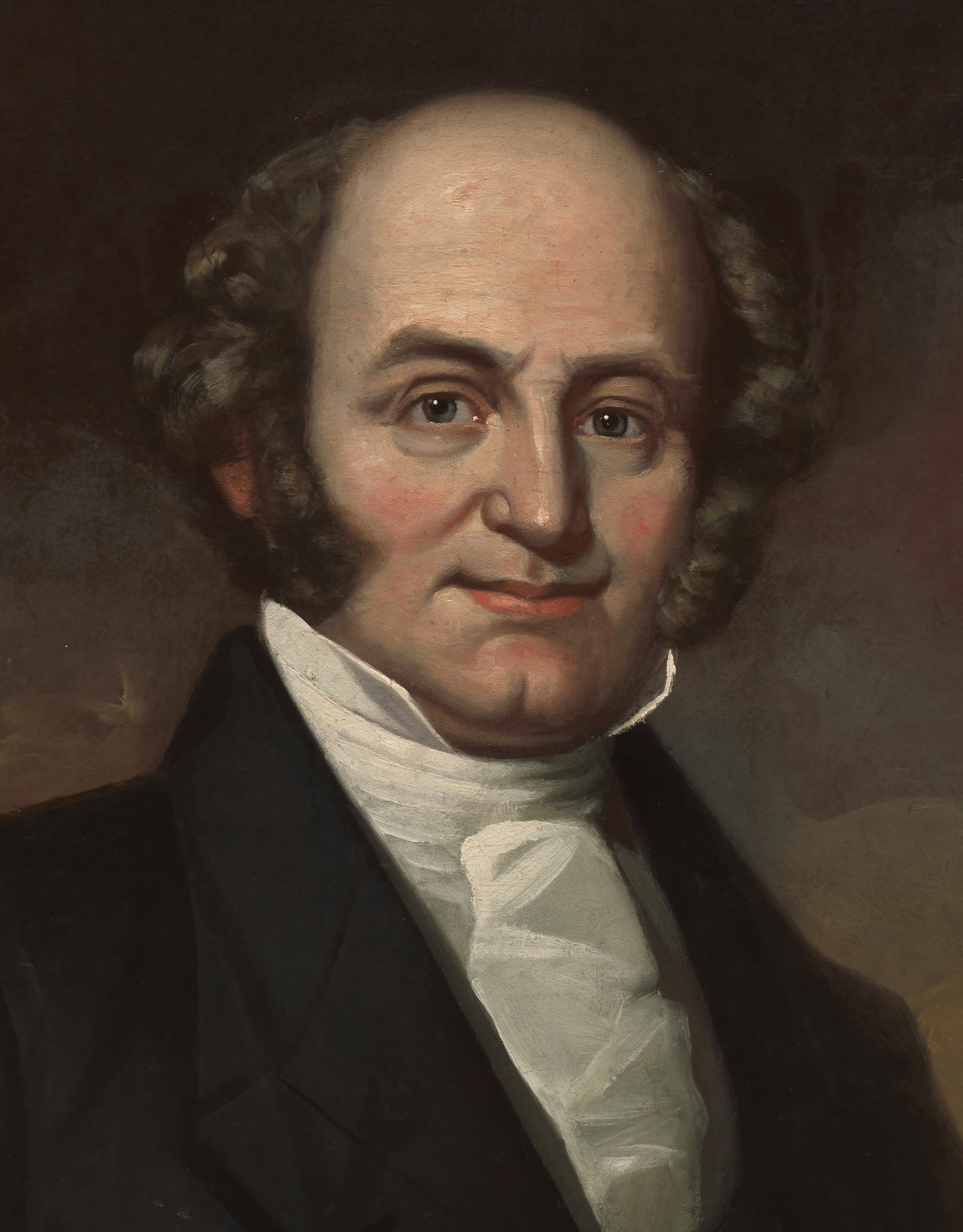
Nominee	William Henry Harrison	Martin Van Buren
Party	Whig	Democratic
Home state	Ohio	New York
Running mate	John Tyler	none
Electoral vote	3	0
Popular vote	5,967	4,872
Percentage	54.99%	44.89%
County results
Harrison
50–60%
President before election
Martin Van Buren
Democratic
Elected President
William Henry Harrison
Whig

The 1840 United States presidential election in Delaware was held on November 10, 1840 as part of the 1840 United States presidential election. Voters chose three representatives, or electors to the Electoral College, who voted for President and Vice President.

Delaware voted for the Whig candidate, William Henry Harrison, over Democratic candidate Martin Van Buren. Harrison won Delaware by a margin of 10.1%.

== Results ==
General Election Results
Party	Pledged to	Elector	Votes
Whig Party	William Henry Harrison	Peter F. Causey	5,967
Whig Party	William Henry Harrison	Benjamin Caulk	5,962
Whig Party	William Henry Harrison	Henry F. Hall	5,958
Democratic Party	Martin Van Buren	Thomas Jacobs	4,872
Democratic Party	Martin Van Buren	Christopher Vandergrift	4,871
Democratic Party	Martin Van Buren	Nehemiah Clarke	4,870
Write-in		Scattering	13
Votes cast (Note: Based on highest elector on each ticket)			10,852

=== Results by county ===
County	William Henry Harrison Whig		Martin Van Buren Democratic		Margin		Total votes cast
County	#	%	#	%	#	%	Total votes cast
Kent	1,593	59.20%	1,095	40.69%	498	18.51%	2,691 (Note: Includes 3 Scattering votes)
New Castle	2,321	51.28%	2,195	48.50%	126	2.78%	4,526 (Note: Includes 10 Scattering votes)
Sussex	2,053	56.48%	1,582	43.52%	471	12.96%	3,635
Totals	5,967	54.99%	4,872	44.89%	1,095	10.09%	10,852

==== Counties that flipped from Democratic to Whig ====
- New Castle

== See also ==
- United States presidential elections in Delaware
