= 1839 Whig National Convention =

U.S. political event held in Harrisburg, Pennsylvania

- 1840 presidential election
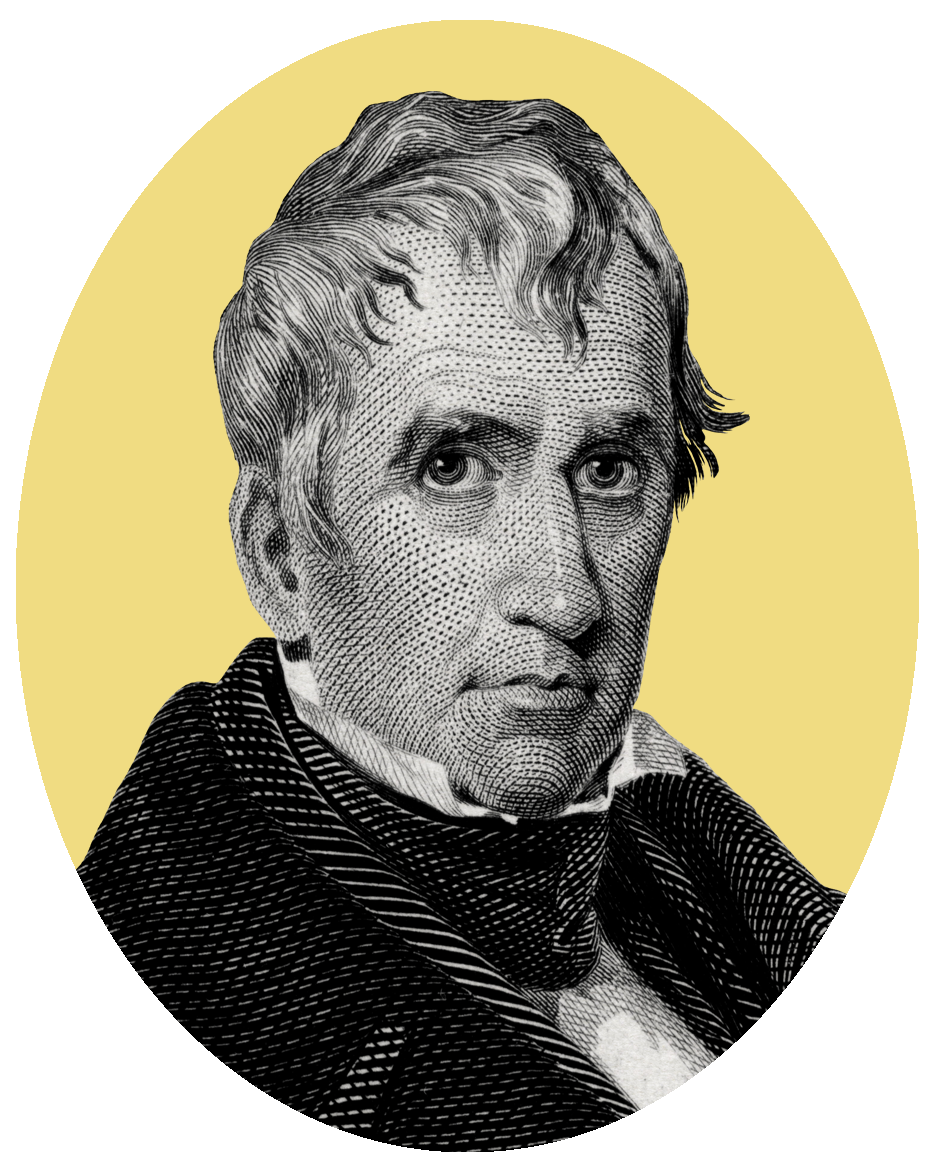
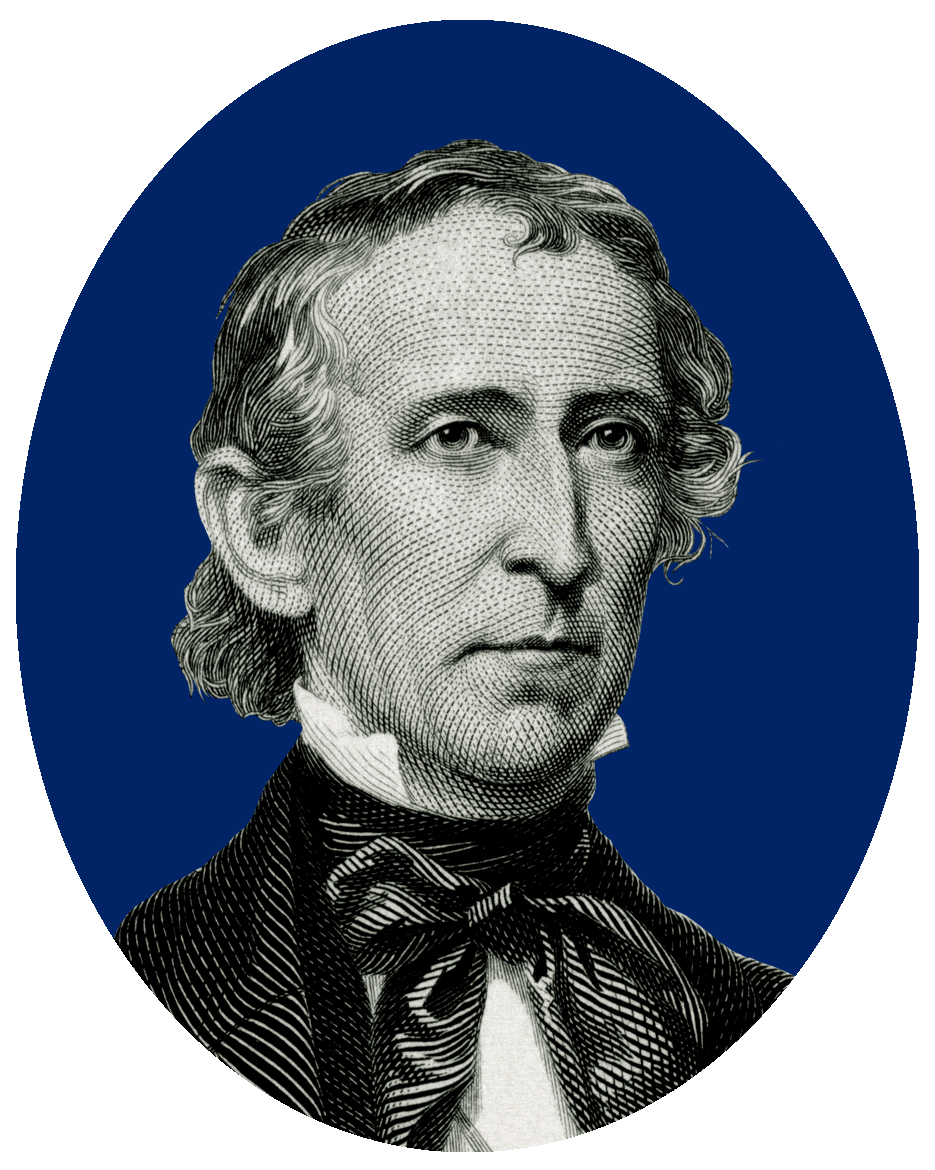
- Nominees; Harrison and Tyler

Convention
- Dates: December 4–8, 1839
- City: Harrisburg, Pennsylvania
- Venue: Zion Lutheran Church

Candidates
- Presidential nominee: William H. Harrison of Ohio
- Vice-presidential nominee: John Tyler of Virginia

Voting
- Total delegates: 257
- Votes needed for nomination: 128
- Results (president): Harrison (OH): 148 (58.27%); Clay (KY): 90 (35.43%); Scott (NJ): 16 (6.30%)
- Results (vice president): John Tyler (VA): 231 (100%)
- Ballots: 5

The 1839 Whig National Convention was a presidential nominating convention held from December 4 to December 8 in Harrisburg, Pennsylvania. It was the first national convention ever held by the Whig Party, and was organized to select the party's nominee in the 1840 presidential election. The convention nominated former Senator William Henry Harrison of Ohio for president and former Senator John Tyler of Virginia for vice president.

After Daniel Webster dropped out of the race, the three leading candidates for the Whig nomination were General Harrison, who had been the most successful Whig candidate in the 1836 presidential election; General Winfield Scott, a hero of the War of 1812; and Senator Henry Clay, the Whigs' congressional and philosophical leader. With Southern delegates united behind him, Clay led on the first presidential ballot, but failed to win a majority. Harrison won the nomination on the fifth ballot after several delegates switched from supporting Clay or Scott. The convention chose Tyler, a Southerner and Clay supporter, to serve as Harrison's running mate. The Whig ticket went on to win the 1840 election, defeating incumbent Democratic President Martin Van Buren.

== Presidential nomination ==
Clay led on the first ballot, but circumstances conspired to deny him the nomination. First, the convention came on the heels of a string of Whig electoral losses, and party members were anxious to reverse the trend. Harrison managed to distance himself from the losses, but Clay, as the party's philosophical leader, could not. Had the convention been held in the spring of 1840, when the continuing economic downturn caused by the Panic of 1837 led to a string of Whig victories, Clay would have had much greater support. Second, the convention rules had been drawn up so that whoever won the majority of delegates from a given state would win all the votes from that state. This worked against Clay, who could have combined solid majority support in almost all the Southern delegations (with little potential for opponents to capitalize on a proportional distribution of delegates), and a large minority support in Northern delegations if the rules allowed counting of individual delegate votes. Third, several Southern states whose Whig party organizations supported Clay abstained from sending delegates to the convention.

Harrison won on the fifth ballot after Clay delegates from Illinois and Scott delegates from Michigan, New York, and Vermont combined to switch their support to Harrison. Writer and activist John Neal, who chaired the delegation from Maine, claimed to have been instrumental in convincing the powerful New York delegation to back Harrison prior to the final vote. The state-by-state roll call was printed in the newspaper the Farmer's Cabinet on December 13, 1839:

=== Candidates ===
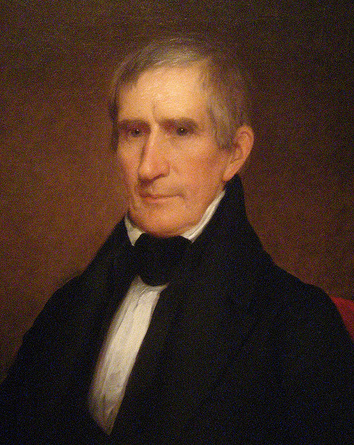
General
William Henry Harrison
of Ohio

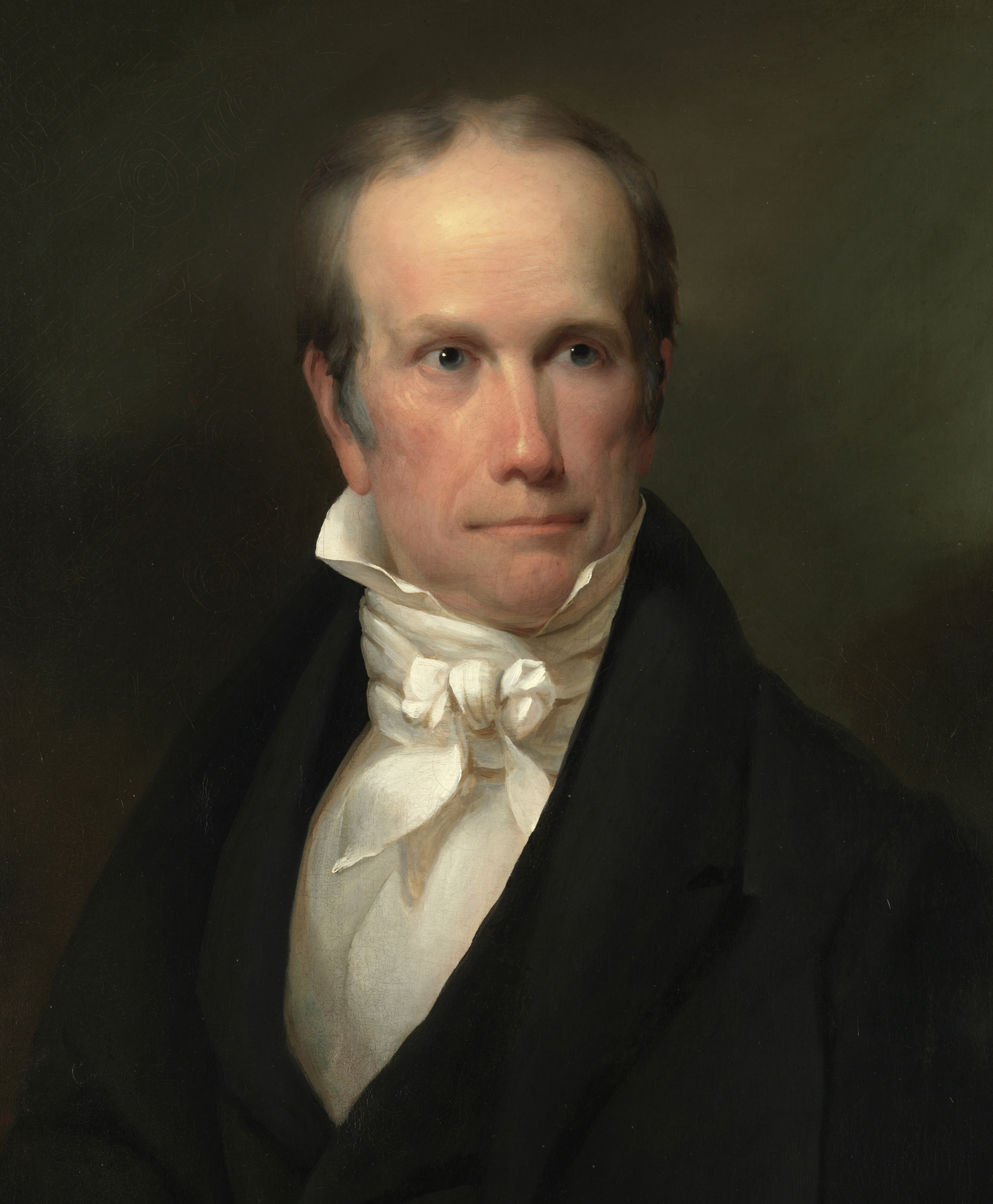
Senator
Henry Clay
of Kentucky

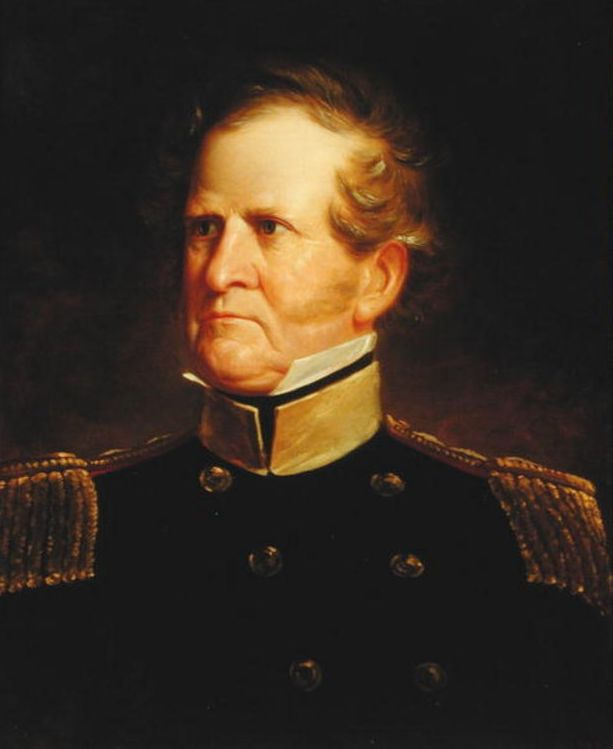
General
Winfield Scott
of New Jersey

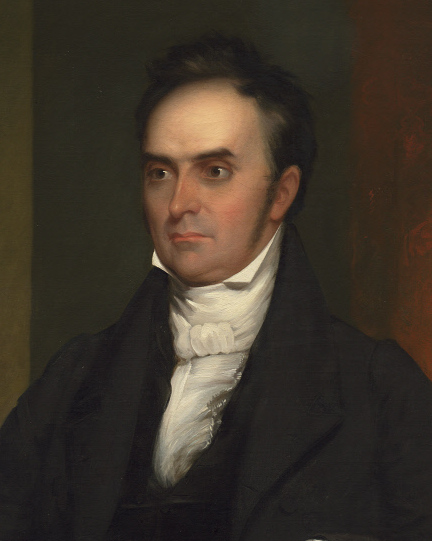
Senator
Daniel Webster
of Massachusetts
(Withdrawn)

=== Nomination ===
Presidential nomination (Note: Several contemporaneous sources list Michigan for Harrison on the first two ballots; however, one Michigan delegate was delayed and the state's delegation deadlocked until the third ballot, when the arrival of the late delegate flipped the state to Scott. The delegate from Arkansas was similarly delayed and did not arrive until after the balloting for president and vice president.)
Candidate	1st	2nd	3rd	4th	5th
Henry Clay of Kentucky	103	103	95	95	90
William H. Harrison of Ohio	91	91	91	91	148
Winfield Scott of New Jersey	57	57	68	68	16
Total	251	251	254	254	254
Majority	126	126	128	128	128
Not voting	6	6	3	3	3

=== Maps ===
1st–2nd presidential ballot: results by state

3rd–4th presidential ballot: results by state

5th presidential ballot: results by state

== Vice presidential nomination ==
=== Candidates ===
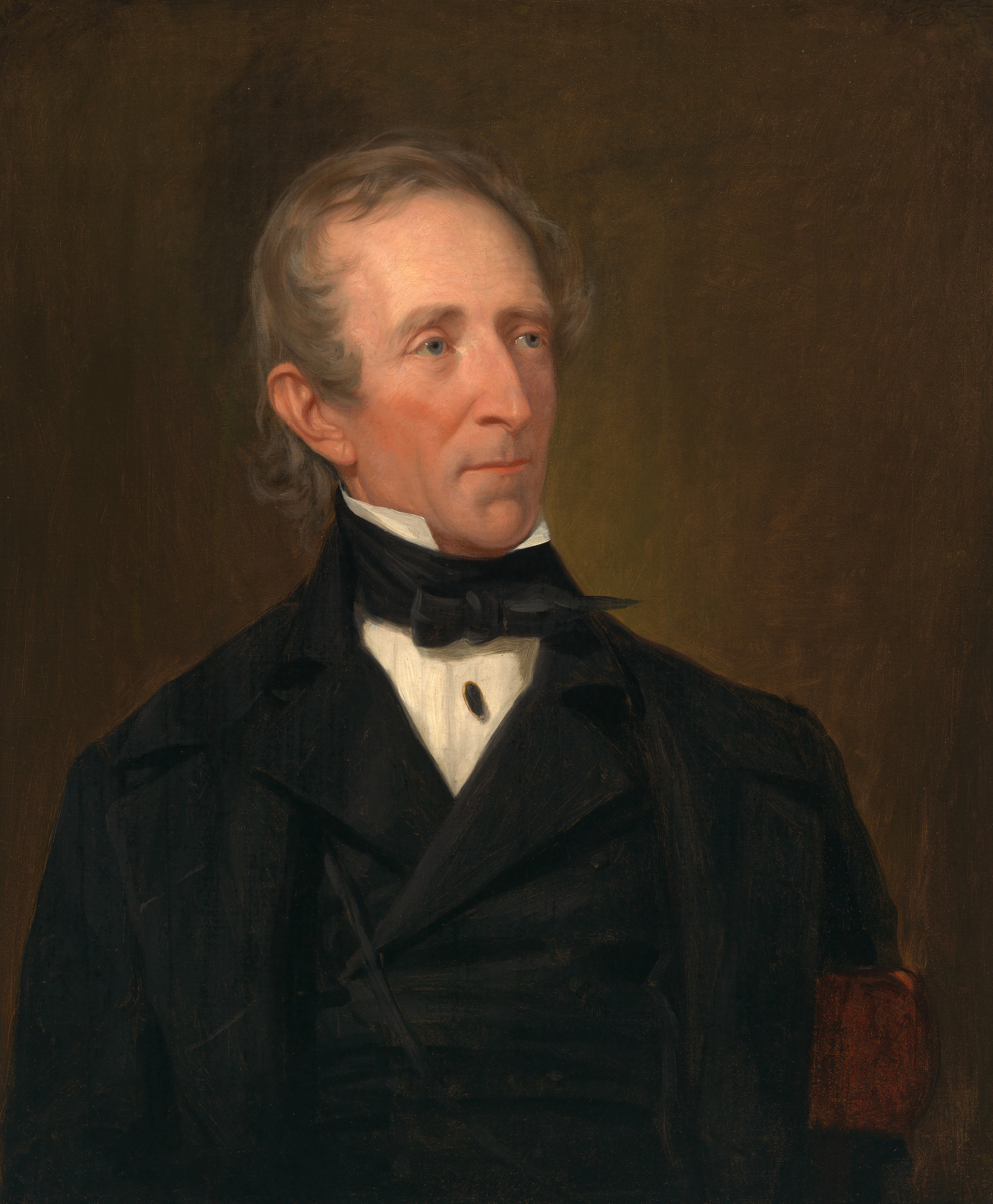
Former Senator
John Tyler
of Virginia

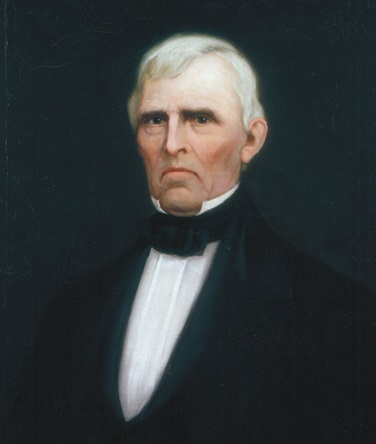
Senator
John J. Crittenden
of Kentucky
(Withdrawn)

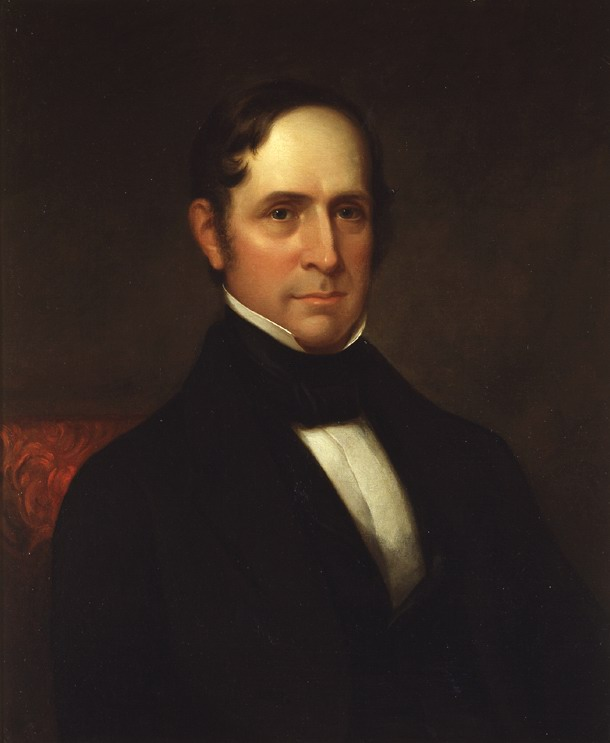
Former Senator
Willie P. Mangum
of North Carolina
(Withdrawn)

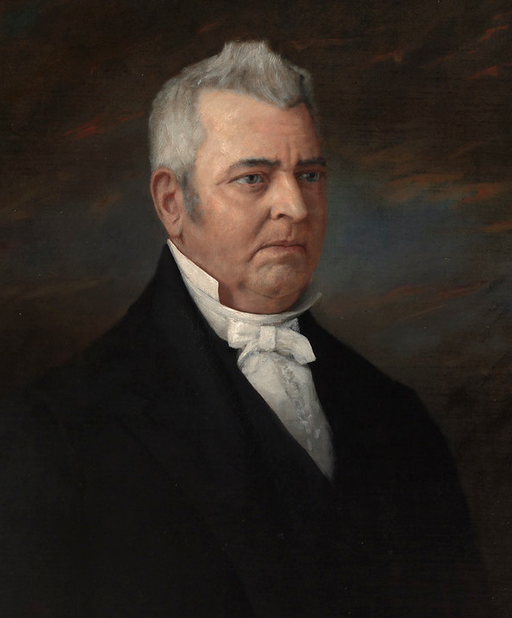
Former Senator
John M. Clayton
of Delaware
(Withdrawn)

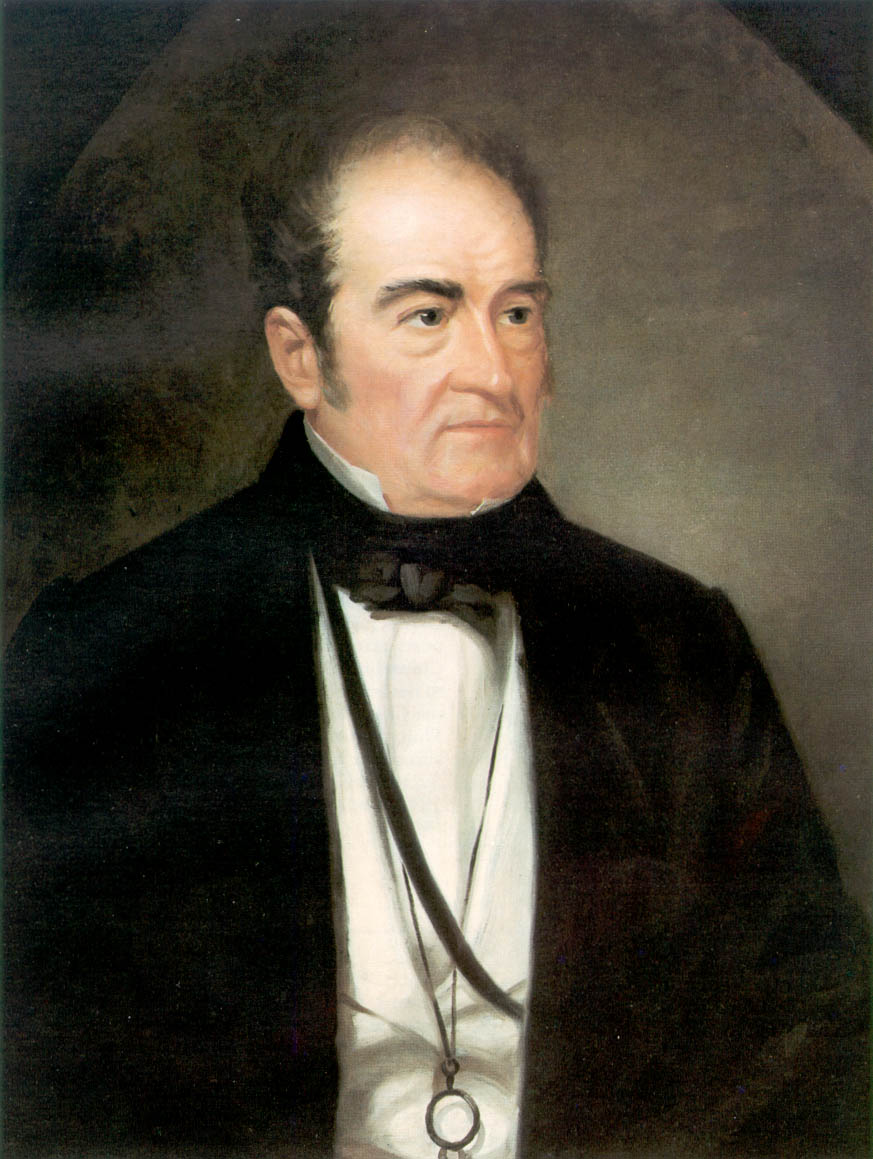
Former Representative
John Bell
of Tennessee
(Withdrawn)

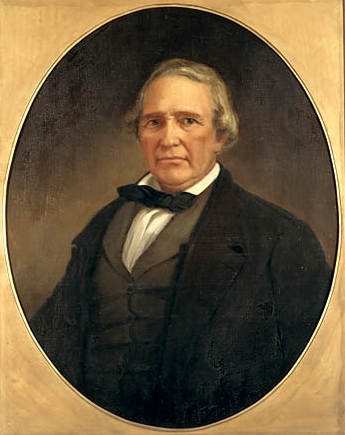
Governor
Edward B. Dudley
of North Carolina
(Withdrawn)

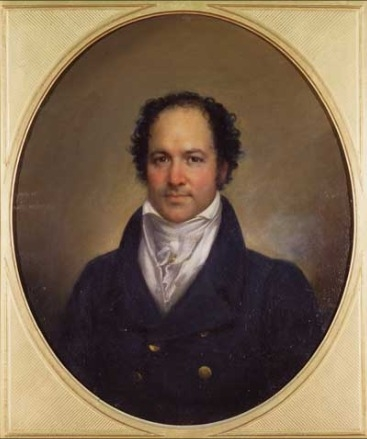
Former Senator
Benjamin W. Leigh
of Virginia
(Withdrawn)

Because Harrison (born in Virginia) was considered a Northerner (as a resident of Ohio), the Whigs needed to balance the ticket with a Southerner. They also sought a Clay supporter to help unite the party. After being turned down by several potential candidates, including John J. Crittenden, John Bell, and Willie Person Mangum, the convention finally found its Southerner who had faithfully supported Clay and would accept: former Senator John Tyler. Tyler was well known to the delegates, having previously been the running mate of Hugh Lawson White and Willie Person Mangum during the four-way Whig campaign of 1836. He was easily nominated on the first ballot.

=== Nomination ===
Vice presidential nomination (Note: Virginia's 23 delegates abstained. The delegate from Arkansas was delayed and did not arrive until after the balloting for president and vice president.)
Candidate	1st
John Tyler of Virginia	231
Total	231
Majority	116
Not voting	26

=== Maps ===
1st vice presidential ballot: results by state

== Aftermath ==
During the balloting, Clay and Scott played cards with two Whig politicians, John J. Crittenden and George Evans, at the Astor House hotel in New York City.

When the group received word of Harrison's victory, Clay blamed his loss on Scott and punched him, hitting the shoulder which had been wounded during Scott's participation in the Battle of Lundy's Lane, before being physically removed from the hotel room.

Scott then sent Crittenden to Clay with Scott's challenge for a duel, but Crittenden reconciled them by convincing Clay to apologize.

== See also ==
- 1840 Democratic National Convention
- U.S. presidential nomination convention
- 1840 United States presidential election

== Bibliography ==
- Penrose, Charles B., ed. (1839). Proceedings of the Democratic Whig National Convention [...]. Harrisburg.
- Holt, Michael F. (1999). The Rise and Fall of the American Whig Party: Jacksonian Politics and the Onset of the Civil War. New York: Oxford University Press.
