= List of songs used for presidential campaigns in the United States =

In the United States, candidates running for elected office run a campaign that promotes their platform. In quadrennial presidential elections in the United States, the largest election in the country, candidates and their campaigns will often choose or become associated with a campaign song.

== 18th century ==
Election	Candidate	Party	Song	Songwriter / Lyricist	Ref.
1788–89	George Washington	Independent	"Follow Washington"	Traditional	
1792	George Washington	Independent	"Follow Washington"	Traditional	

== 19th century ==
Entries listed in bold indicate the winner of that year's election.

Election	Candidate	Party	Song	Songwriter / Lyricist	Ref.
1800	John Adams	Federalist	"Adams and Liberty" (Tune: The Anacreontic Song)	John Stafford Smith and Robert Treat Paine Jr.	
1804	**Thomas Jefferson**	Democratic-Republican	"Jefferson and Liberty"	John Stafford Smith	
1808	**James Madison**	Democratic-Republican	"Huzzah for Madison, Huzzah"		
1816	**James Monroe**	Democratic-Republican	"Monroe is the Man"		
1824	**John Quincy Adams**	Democratic-Republican	"Little Know Ye Who's Coming"		
1828	**Andrew Jackson** (campaign)	Democratic	"Hunters of Kentucky"	Samuel Woodworth	
1840	**William Henry Harrison** (campaign)	Whig	"Tippecanoe and Tyler Too"	Alexander Coffman Ross	
1840	**William Henry Harrison** (campaign)	Whig	"The Harrison Yankee Doodle" (Tune: Yankee Doodle)		
1840	Martin Van Buren	Democratic	"Rock-a-bye Baby"		
1844	**James K. Polk**	Democratic	"Jimmy Polk of Tennessee"		
1844	**James K. Polk**	Democratic	"Polk, Dallas, and Texas"		
1844	**James K. Polk**	Democratic	"Hard Times"		
1844	**James K. Polk**	Democratic	"Two Dollars a Day and Roast Beef"		
1844	**James K. Polk**	Democratic	"Get out the way, Old Harry Clay!" (Tune: Old Dan Tucker)		
1844	Henry Clay	Whig	"Great Henry Clay"		
1844	Henry Clay	Whig	"Harry of the West"		
1844	Henry Clay	Whig	"Clear the Way for Harry Clay"		
1844	Henry Clay	Whig	"Farmer Clay" (Tune: Yankee Doodle)		
1844	Henry Clay	Whig	"Clay and Frelinghuysen"		
1844	Henry Clay	Whig	"Get out of the Way!" (Tune: Old Dan Tucker)		
1844	James G. Birney	Liberty	"Get off the Track!" (Tune: Old Dan Tucker)	Jesse Hutchinson	
1848	**Zachary Taylor**	Whig	"Hurrah for Rough and Ready" (Tune: Old Dan Tucker)		
1848	**Zachary Taylor**	Whig	"Rumadum Dum"		
1848	Lewis Cass	Democratic	“He who’d vote for Zachy Taylor/Needs a keeper or a jailer.”		
1848	Martin Van Buren	Free Soil	"The Old Free States"	Jesse Hutchinson	
1852	**Franklin Pierce**	Democratic	"Pierce and Kine"		
1856	**James Buchanan**	Democratic	"Buchanan and Breckinridge"		
1856	**James Buchanan**	Democratic	"Empire Club Song"		
1856	John C. Frémont	Republican	"We'll Give 'Em Jessie"		
1856	John C. Frémont	Republican	"Huzzah for the Railroad"		
1856	John C. Frémont	Republican	"Frémont and Freedom"		
1856	Millard Fillmore	Know Nothing	"The Union Wagon" (Tune: Wait for the Wagon)		
1860	**Abraham Lincoln**	Republican	"Lincoln and Liberty" (Tune: Old Rosin the Beau)	Jesse Hutchinson	
1860	**Abraham Lincoln**	Republican	"The Lincoln Flag" (Tune: Yankee Doodle)		
1860	**Abraham Lincoln**	Republican	"Honest Abe of the West"		
1860	**Abraham Lincoln**	Republican	"Ole Abe's Preliminary Visit to the White House"		
1860	**Abraham Lincoln**	Republican	"Old Abe the Rail Splitter"		
1860	**Abraham Lincoln**	Republican	"Hurrah for Lincoln"		
1860	**Abraham Lincoln**	Republican	"We'll Vote for Lincoln" (Tune: Wait for the Wagon)	Linda Lindon	
1860	**Abraham Lincoln**	Republican	"Lincoln and Hamlin—God Bless Them!"		
1860	**Abraham Lincoln**	Republican	"Lincoln is the Man"		
1860	**Abraham Lincoln**	Republican	"Give Us Abe and Hamlin, Too"		
1860	**Abraham Lincoln**	Republican	"Lincoln Banner Song"		
1860	**Abraham Lincoln**	Republican	"Old Abe and His Fights"		
1860	**Abraham Lincoln**	Republican	"Abe Lincoln's Excelsior"		
1860	**Abraham Lincoln**	Republican	"The Lincoln Wedge"		
1860	Stephen A. Douglas	Democratic	"Stand by the Flag" (Tune: Star Spangled Banner)		
1864	**Abraham Lincoln**	National Union	"Battle Cry of Freedom"	George Frederick Root	
1864	George B. McClellan	Democratic	"McClellan is the Man"		
1864	George B. McClellan	Democratic	"Soon We'll Have the Union Back"		
1864	George B. McClellan	Democratic	"Little Mac Shall Be Restored"		
1864	George B. McClellan	Democratic	"White Soldiers' Song"		
1864	George B. McClellan	Democratic	"Fight for the Nigger"		
1868	**Ulysses S. Grant**	Republican	"Grant, Grant, Grant"		
1876	**Rutherford B. Hayes**	Republican	"For Hayes and Wheeler, Too"		
1880	**James A. Garfield**	Republican	"If the Johnnies Get into Power Again"		
1884	**Grover Cleveland**	Democratic	"Democrats, Good Democrats"		
1888	**Benjamin Harrison**	Republican	"He's All Right"		
1888	Grover Cleveland	Democratic	"Cleveland's Second Term Grand March"	George P. Lyon	
1896	**William McKinley**	Republican	"Marching with McKinley"		

== 20th century ==
Entries listed in bold indicate the winner of that year's election.

Election	Candidate	Party	Song	Songwriter / Lyricist	Ref.
1904	**Theodore Roosevelt**	Republican	"Roosevelt the Cry"		
1912	William Howard Taft	Republican	"Get on a Raft with Taft"		
1912	**Woodrow Wilson**	Democratic	"Wilson, That's All"		
1912	Theodore Roosevelt	Progressive	"We’re ready for Teddy again"	Harry D. Kerr	
1912	Theodore Roosevelt	Progressive	"The March of the Moose"	H. L. Conant	
1912	Eugene V. Debs	Socialist	"The Internationale"		
1920	**Warren G. Harding**	Republican	"Harding, You're the Man for Us"	Al Jolson	
1924	**Calvin Coolidge**	Republican	"Keep Cool and Keep Coolidge"	Bruce Harper and Ida Cheever Goodwin	
1928	**Herbert Hoover**	Republican	"If He's Good Enough for Lindy"	Joe Glazer	
1928	Al Smith (campaign)	Democratic	"The Sidewalks of New York"	Charles B. Lawlor and James W. Blake	
1932	**Franklin D. Roosevelt**	Democratic	"Happy Days Are Here Again"	Milton Ager and Jack Yellen	
1932	Herbert Hoover	Republican	"Let's Get Behind Herbert Hoover"		
1936	**Franklin D. Roosevelt**	Democratic	"That’s Why We’re Voting For Roosevelt"	Thomas O'Dowd	
1936	Alf Landon	Republican	"Oh, Alf Landon!"		
1940	**Franklin D. Roosevelt**	Democratic	"Carry on with Roosevelt"	George Garofalides	
1940	Wendell Willkie	Republican	"We Want Willkie"		
1948	**Harry S. Truman** (campaign)	Democratic	"I'm Just Wild About Harry"	Eubie Blake and Noble Sissle	
1952	**Dwight D. Eisenhower**	Republican	"Ike for President"	Walt Disney Studios	
1956	**Dwight D. Eisenhower**	Republican	"We Love the Sunshine of Your Smile"	The Pied Pipers and Mark Carter and his Orchestra	
1956	Adlai Stevenson II	Democratic	"We're Madly for Adlai"	Gilbert S. Watson	
1960	**John F. Kennedy** (campaign)	Democratic	"High Hopes"	Jimmy Van Heusen and Sammy Cahn	
1964	**Lyndon B. Johnson** (campaign)	Democratic	"Hello, Lyndon!" (Note: Originally released as "Hello, Dolly" with lyrics modified to reference the candidate's name)	Jerry Herman (performed by Carol Channing)	
1964	Barry Goldwater (campaign)	Republican	"Go with Goldwater"	Tom McDonnell and Otis Clements	
1968	Robert F. Kennedy (campaign)	Democratic	"Omaha Rainbow"	John Stewart	
1968	**Richard Nixon** (campaign)	Republican	"Nixon's the One"	Moose Charlap and Alvin Cooperman	
1972	**Richard Nixon** (campaign)	Republican	"Nixon Now"	Ken Sutherland, performed by the Mike Curb Congregation	
1972	George McGovern (campaign)	Democratic	"Bridge over Troubled Water"	Paul Simon	
1976	**Jimmy Carter** (campaign)	Democratic	"Ode to the Georgia Farmer"	K.E. and Julia Marsh	
1976	**Jimmy Carter** (campaign)	Democratic	"Why Not the Best?"	Oscar Brand	
1976	Gerald Ford (campaign)	Republican	"I'm Feeling Good About America"	Robert K. Gardner	
1980	**Ronald Reagan** (campaign)	Republican	"California, Here I Come"	Buddy DeSylva and Joseph Meyer	
1984	Walter Mondale (campaign)	Democratic	"Gonna Fly Now"	Bill Conti	
1988	**George H. W. Bush** (campaign)	Republican	"This Land Is Your Land"	Woody Guthrie	
1988	**George H. W. Bush** (campaign)	Republican	"The George Bush Song"	Willie Barrow and Sylvia Johns Cain	
1988	Michael Dukakis (campaign)	Democratic	"America"	Neil Diamond	
1992	Ross Perot (campaign)	Independent	"Crazy"	Willie Nelson	
1992	**Bill Clinton** (campaign)	Democratic	"Don't Stop"	Christine McVie	
1996	Bob Dole (campaign)	Republican	"Dole Man" (Note: Originally released as "Soul Man", with lyrics modified to reference the candidate's name)	Isaac Hayes, David Porter, and Sam Moore	
1996	Lamar Alexander	Republican	"Alexander's Ragtime Band"	Irving Berlin	

== 21st century ==
Entries listed in bold indicate the winner of that year's election.

Election	Candidate	Party	Song	Recording Artist	Ref.
2000	Al Gore (campaign)	Democratic	"You Ain't Seen Nothing Yet"	Bachman–Turner Overdrive	
2000	Al Gore (campaign)	Democratic	"Sir Duke"	Stevie Wonder	
2000	Al Gore (campaign)	Democratic	"Let the Day Begin"	Michael Been	
2000	Al Gore (campaign)	Democratic	"Praise You"	Fatboy Slim	
2000	**George W. Bush** (campaign)	Republican	"I Won't Back Down"	Tom Petty	
2000	**George W. Bush** (campaign)	Republican	"We the People"	Billy Ray Cyrus	
2000	**George W. Bush** (campaign)	Republican	"Right Now"	Van Halen	
2004	**George W. Bush** (campaign)	Republican	"Only in America"	Brooks & Dunn	
2004	**George W. Bush** (campaign)	Republican	"Wave on Wave"	Pat Green	
2004	Howard Dean (campaign)	Democratic	"We Can"	LeAnn Rimes	
2004	John Kerry (campaign)	Democratic	"No Surrender"	Bruce Springsteen	
2004	John Kerry (campaign)	Democratic	"Fortunate Son"	Creedence Clearwater Revival	
2004	John Kerry (campaign)	Democratic	"Beautiful Day"	U2	
2008	Rudy Giuliani (campaign)	Republican	"Take Us Out"	Jerry Goldsmith	
2008	Rudy Giuliani (campaign)	Republican	"Rudie Can't Fail"	Joe Strummer and Mick Jones	
2008	Rudy Giuliani (campaign)	Republican	"Life Is a Highway"	Rascal Flatts	
2008	Mike Huckabee (campaign)	Republican	"More Than a Feeling"	Boston	
2008	Dennis Kucinich (campaign)	Democratic	"Give Peace a Chance"	John Lennon	
2008	Chris Dodd (campaign)	Democratic	"Get Ready"	Smokey Robinson	
2008	Chris Dodd (campaign)	Democratic	"Reach Out I'll Be There"	Holland–Dozier–Holland	
2008	John Edwards (campaign)	Democratic	"Our Country"	John Mellencamp	
2008	Hillary Clinton (campaign)	Democrat	"Blue Sky"	Todd Park Mohr	
2008	Hillary Clinton (campaign)	Democrat	"Suddenly I See"	KT Tunstall	
2008	Hillary Clinton (campaign)	Democrat	"You and I"	Celine Dion	
2008	Hillary Clinton (campaign)	Democrat	"Takin' Care of Business"	Bachman–Turner Overdrive	
2008	Hillary Clinton (campaign)	Democrat	"9 to 5"	Dolly Parton	
2008	Hillary Clinton (campaign)	Democrat	"American Girl"	Tom Petty and the Heartbreakers	
2008	Cynthia McKinney (campaign)	Green	"Power to the People"	John Lennon	
2008	John McCain (campaign)	Republican	"Take Us Out"	Jerry Goldsmith	
2008	John McCain (campaign)	Republican	"Take a Chance on Me"	ABBA	
2008	John McCain (campaign)	Republican	"Our Country"	John Mellencamp	
2008	John McCain (campaign)	Republican	"Raisin' McCain"	John Rich	
2008	**Barack Obama** (campaign)	Democrat	"Yes We Can"	will.i.am	
2008	**Barack Obama** (campaign)	Democrat	"Better Way"	Ben Harper	
2008	**Barack Obama** (campaign)	Democrat	"Signed, Sealed, Delivered I'm Yours"	Stevie Wonder	
2008	**Barack Obama** (campaign)	Democrat	"City of Blinding Lights"	U2	
2008	**Barack Obama** (campaign)	Democrat	"Higher and Higher"	Jackie Wilson	
2008	**Barack Obama** (campaign)	Democrat	"Think"	Aretha Franklin	
2008	**Barack Obama** (campaign)	Democrat	"The Rising"	Bruce Springsteen	
2008	**Barack Obama** (campaign)	Democrat	"Only in America"	Brooks & Dunn	
2012	**Barack Obama** (campaign)	Democratic	"We Take Care of Our Own"	Bruce Springsteen	
2012	Mitt Romney (campaign)	Republican	"Born Free"	Kid Rock	
2012	Mitt Romney (campaign)	Republican	"It's America"	Rodney Atkins	
2016	John Kasich (campaign)	Republican	"Beautiful Day"	U2	
2016	Bernie Sanders (campaign)	Democratic	"America"	Paul Simon	
2016	Bernie Sanders (campaign)	Democratic	"Talkin' 'bout a Revolution"	Tracy Chapman	
2016	Bernie Sanders (campaign)	Democratic	"Starman"	David Bowie	
2016	**Donald Trump** (campaign)	Republican	"You Can't Always Get What You Want"	The Rolling Stones	
2016	**Donald Trump** (campaign)	Republican	"God Bless the U.S.A."	Lee Greenwood	
2016	Hillary Clinton (campaign)	Democratic	"Fight Song"	Rachel Platten	
2016	Hillary Clinton (campaign)	Democratic	"Roar"	Katy Perry	
2016	Hillary Clinton (campaign)	Democratic	"Brave"	Sara Bareilles	
2016	Rand Paul (campaign)	Republican	"Revolution"	The Beatles	
2016	Ted Cruz (campaign)	Republican	"Where the Stars and Stripes and the Eagle Fly"	Aaron Tippin	
2020	Beto O'Rourke (campaign)	Democratic	"Clampdown"	The Clash	
2020	Pete Buttigieg (campaign)	Democratic	"High Hopes"	Panic! at the Disco	
2020	Bernie Sanders (campaign)	Democratic	"Seven Nation Army"	The White Stripes	
2020	Bernie Sanders (campaign)	Democratic	"Power to the People"	John Lennon	
2020	**Joe Biden** (campaign)	Democratic	"We Take Care of Our Own"	Bruce Springsteen	
2020	**Joe Biden** (campaign)	Democratic	"Higher and Higher"	Jackie Wilson	
2020	**Joe Biden** (campaign)	Democratic	"Move On Up"	Curtis Mayfield	
2020	**Joe Biden** (campaign)	Democratic	"We the People"	Booker T. Jones and Carl Smith	
2020	**Joe Biden** (campaign)	Democratic	"A Sky Full of Stars"	Coldplay	
2020	Kamala Harris (campaign)	Democratic	"Work That"	Mary J. Blige	
2020	Elizabeth Warren (campaign)	Democratic	"9 to 5"	Dolly Parton	
2020	Elizabeth Warren (campaign)	Democratic	"Respect"	Aretha Franklin	
2020	Andrew Yang (campaign)	Democratic	"Return of the Mack"	Mark Morrison	
2020	Jay Inslee (campaign)	Democratic	"Mr. Blue Sky"	Electric Light Orchestra	
2020	Amy Klobuchar (campaign)	Democratic	"The Bullpen"	Dessa	
2020	Donald Trump (campaign)	Republican	"Y.M.C.A."	Village People	
2024	**Donald Trump** (campaign)	Republican	"Hold On, I'm Comin'"	Sam & Dave	
2024	Nikki Haley (campaign)	Republican	"Eye of the Tiger"	Survivor	
2024	Nikki Haley (campaign)	Republican	"I Love Rock 'n' Roll"	Joan Jett and the Blackhearts	
2024	Nikki Haley (campaign)	Republican	"We Got the Beat"	The Go-Go's	
2024	Ron DeSantis (campaign)	Republican	"Only Here for a Little While"	Billy Dean	
2024	Mike Pence (campaign)	Republican	"Only in America"	Brooks & Dunn	
2024	Vivek Ramaswamy (campaign)	Republican	"Thunder"	Imagine Dragons	
2024	Robert F. Kennedy Jr. (campaign)	Independent	"Real American"	Rick Derringer	
2024	Kamala Harris (campaign)	Democratic	"Freedom"	Beyoncé	
