= Old Settler =

Old Settler may refer to:

- The Old Settler, a mountain in the Lillooet Ranges of British Columbia, Canada
- Old Settlers, Cherokee tribal members who relocated west to the Arkansaw or Indian Territories prior to 1828
- Old Settler (sternwheeler), a sternwheel steamboat that ran on Puget sound from 1878 to about 1895
- Old Settlers' Association, a social organization in Omaha, Nebraska, United States
- Old Settler's Song (Acres of Clams), a song by Francis D. Henry around 1874
