= Lincoln and Liberty =

Song

Lincoln and Liberty

Hurrah for the choice of the nation!
Our chieftain so brave and so true;
We'll go for the great Reformation —
For Lincoln and Liberty too!

We'll go for the son of Kentucky
The hero of Hoosierdom through;
The pride of the Illinois so lucky
For Lincoln and Liberty too!

— First verse and chorus

"Lincoln and Liberty Too" was a campaign song supporting Republican Abraham Lincoln in the 1860 United States presidential election.

== History ==
Attributed to Jesse Hutchinson Jr. of the Hutchinson Family Singers the song adapted from the tune of "Old Rosin the Beau" and was originally called "Liberty Ball." The title echoes earlier songs with the same melody as "Adams and Liberty" and repeated in later campaign songs. Shortly after Jesse's death in 1853, the song was modified to support Lincoln's presidency. The song was last sung by the Hutchinson Family at the 1892 dedication for the statue of John P. Hale. Frederick Douglass also was present and sang with the Hutchinson Family.

The song expresses themes of abolitionism and log cabin virtues, with the chorus also expansively establishing Lincoln as a favorite son of three states (Kentucky, Indiana and Illinois). The Hutchinson family traveled through the country singing the song at Lincoln campaign rallies and even in the White House. Another version of the song, sung by Ronnie Gilbert and ostensibly written by Jesse Hutchinson, praises abolitionism and emancipation, and condemns racism.

In the novel Paradise Alley by Kevin Baker, young Republicans sang the song in a political rally (see pg. 422).

The song became the official campaign song for President Lincoln's campaign. Rallies supporting Lincoln sang the song, and it was also published in The Hutchinson's Republican Songster.

== Lyrics ==
Hurrah for the choice of the nation!
Our chieftain so brave and so true;
We'll go for the great Reformation—
For Lincoln and Liberty too!

We'll go for the son of Kentucky—
The hero of Hoosierdom through;
The pride of the Suckers so lucky—
For Lincoln and Liberty too!

Our David's good sling is unerring,
The Slaveocrats' giant he slew;
Then shout for the Freedom-preferring—
For Lincoln and Liberty too!

They'll find what, by felling and mauling,
Our rail-maker statesman can do;
For the People are everywhere calling
For Lincoln and Liberty too!

Then up with our banner so glorious,
The star-spangled red-white-and-blue,
We'll fight till our flag is victorious,
For Lincoln and Liberty too!

Verses concerning the abolition of slavery which have sometimes been added to performances of "Lincoln and Liberty" belong more properly to "The Liberty Ball," an earlier song written by George W. Clark to the same tune and published in 1845:

Come all ye true friends of the nation
Attend to humanity's call
Come aid the poor slave's liberation
And roll on the liberty ball.

We'll finish the Temple of Freedom
And make it capacious within
That all who seek shelter may find it
Whatever the hue of their skin.

Success to the old-fashioned doctrine
That men are created all free
And down with the power of the despot
Wherever his strongholds may be.

== See also ==
- "Tippecanoe and Tyler Too"
