= Campaign song =

Song written for a political campaign

Campaign songs are songs used by candidates or political campaigns. Most modern campaign songs are upbeat popular songs or original compositions that articulate a positive message about a campaign or candidate, usually appealing to patriotism, optimism, or a good-natured reference to a personal quality of the candidate such as their ethnic origin or the part of the country they are from. In some cases, the campaign song can be a veiled attack on an opposing candidate or party. Some songs originally devised as a campaign song for a specific election have become identified with the party itself in later election cycles; for example, the Likud's campaign song for the 1992 Israeli legislative election, "The Likud is Right", has become the Party's anthem starting in the late 2000s. The use of a campaign song is primarily known in the quadrennial United States presidential election, where various campaign songs have been used.

== History in the United States ==
The origin of campaign songs were partisan ditties used in American political canvasses and more especially in presidential contests. The words were commonly set to established melodies like "Yankee Doodle," "Hail, Columbia," "Rosin the Bow," "Hail to the Chief" "John Brown's Body," "Dixie" and "O Tannenbaum" ("Maryland, My Maryland"); or to tunes widely popular at the time, such as "Few Days," "Champagne Charlie," "The Wearing of the Green" or "Down in a Coal Mine," which served for "Up in the White House." Perhaps the best known of them was "Tippecanoe and Tyler too," (in which words by Alexander C. Ross were adapted to the folk tune, "Little Pigs"). First heard at Zanesville, Ohio, this spread rapidly over the country, furnishing a party slogan. It has been said: "What (La Marseillaise) was to Frenchmen, "Tippecanoe and Tyler Too" was to the Whigs of 1840." In 1872 an attempt was made to revive the air for "Greeley Is the Real True Blue." The words, sometimes with music, of campaign songs were distributed in paper-covered song books or "songsters." Among these were the Log Cabin Song Book of 1840 and Hutchinson's Republican Songster for the presidential campaign of 1860, compiled by J. W. Hutchinson. For many years national campaigns included itinerant stumpspeakers, live animals, fife-and-drum corps, red fire, floats, transparencies and rousing mass meetings in courthouses and town halls. Glee clubs were organized to introduce campaign songs and to lead audiences and matchers in singing them. The songs were real factors in holding the interest of crowds, emphasizing issues, developing enthusiasm and satirizing opponents. With changes in the methods of campaigning, the campaign song declined as a popular expression.

'Hail to the Chief', which drew from Walter Scott's epic poem The Lady of The Lake, was an early example of America's campaign song tradition. These songs typically leveraged an existing history for party-political gain, referencing folklore or a "popular bard of the day" set to music.

In the mid-19th century, music became more accessible to the middle class and was considered a display of respectability and cultural refinement. As such, political parties began incorporating music into their campaigns to appeal to America's burgeoning middle class.

Despite their political differences, the Whig and Democratic parties repurposed many of the same popular songs, such as "Yankee Doodle". This was partially due to a lack of notated music in songsters; however, it also reflected their intention to generate mass participation by harnessing "the broad range of music in oral circulation" in the 18th century.

=== Whig Party ===
The Whig party employed songs in the 1840 presidential election as an "informal" campaign tactic. The Whigs were considered "far ahead of the Democrats" in their use of campaign songs during the 19th century and had an established tradition of public singing during meetings and speeches.

Then who but he, the true and free,
The Farmer of North Bend
Can deeply feel the Nation's weal,
Or be the people's friend?
Should baneful war approach our shore,
His gallant sword again,
Will strew with prostrate, fallen
The deadly battle plain

— Excerpt From "The Harrison Song", 1840

Whig songwriters typically portrayed their candidates as "heroes" and denounced the Democratic "villains". For example, "The Harrison Song" hailed Whig candidate William Henry Harrison as a great general in the War of 1812 and a humble "farmer" to whom voters could relate.

The Whig party responded to Democratic criticism regarding Harrison's old age and rugged character with songs that extolled the values of "plain living" and pastoral life. This created an impression of Harrison as a humble cider drinker and a "common man of the people". By contrast, the Whigs blamed incumbent Democratic president Martin Van Buren for causing the Panic of 1837 financial crisis due to his indulgence and "passion for expensive champagne in the White House".

=== Democratic Party ===
By the 1844 presidential election, the Democratic Party embraced a similar strategy of using campaign songs in response to the Whig's success in 1840. While promises of the annexation of Texas and the westward expansion of slavery were prominent issues in this election, historian Gavin James Campbell argues that music helped create an "enthusiastic, committed and amused electorate".

Throughout the Democratic campaign, glee clubs sang campaign songs and "enlivened all the rallies". In 1844, the Democrats published The Polk and Dallas Songsters, a pamphlet of songs and poems that proclaimed Polk as a strong leader with lyrics such as:

For Polk's the man that's bound to
Their harry out of the water;

— Lyrics from The Polk and Dallas Songsters

Democratic songs often explored more substantive issues beyond the mockery of political opponents. During the 1844 campaign, the Democrats leaned heavily on the issue of the annexation of Texas with song lyrics claiming Polk would "save Texas from Mexico". These songs roused supporters, some of whom declared they were prepared to "march even to Mexico City".

== Ideological applications ==
=== Creating an American identity ===
Familiar English tunes such as "Yankee Doodle" and "God Save the King" were appropriated with new lyrics that related to the American experience to create a "parody" in strophic form. This was part of a cultural transformation by the American peoples, following the War of Independence, breaking from previous British affiliations towards a new, distinct, independent identity. These parodies emphasised themes of unity, loyalty and liberty in the period following the Revolution where the union of states felt unnatural and fragile. Citizens often relied on this existing material, as a shortcut to learning new songs as a group, typically in a public setting such as a local tavern. These meetings provided opportunity for community engagement in collective identity construction and nation building by defining the values and issues that were important to their young republic. American use of political campaign songs also reflect European trends in the same time period where songs were frequently used by the English, French, Dutch and Germans to generate a feeling of national belonging for their citizens by joining to sing and express shared emotions.

=== Use as propaganda ===
Campaign songs were oft used as an artistic ritual to propagate the political and cultural ideologies of a hopeful candidate to the general population and attract new people to their cause. Campaign songs' reliance on groundswell support for generation of both a voter base and a soapbox for political candidates, is typified by historian James Garratt's concept of "informal promotion" as a type of propaganda that generates support for a practice or leader of the state. Fellow historian John Street writes of campaign songs' pathos, "sounds that are there to establish an emotional response to the party/product". The group performativity of most early campaign songs would often push individuals to conform and submit to popular chants, creating bonds of allegiance with other members of the crowd and the candidate they were venerating.

=== Religious connections ===
The Pythagorean concept of the "music of the spheres", resonated with Protestant elevation of the musical form, as well as Manifest Destiny, justifying westward expansion with the belief that America was a nation blessed by God. Amongst the context of the Second Great Awakening, campaign songs took on an overt resemblance to religious hymns in both form and lyrics. Later on, these religious overtures influenced Republican campaign songs, including "God and the Right" from the 1860 Presidential campaign, suggesting that supporting Abraham Lincoln was a direct service to God:

Follow your leader on!
Young Empire's chosen some
Leads in the fight.
Fling your proud flag on high,
Ring out your battle cry,
Lincoln and Victory,
God and the right!

— Excerpt from "God and the Right", 1860

The "music of the spheres" philosophy also influenced the medical community who began to explore the biological power of music. Prominent physicians including Dr Benjamin Rush believed that the intense emotional experience caused by music had tangible health outcomes.

=== Use as retaliation ===
In early America, no government entity existed which in any way influenced the production of songwriters and composers, short of their role in inspiring creators' lyricism, removing any limitation on truth, censorship or sensationalised material. To combat this freedom exercised by opponents, politicians, like Benjamin Harrison in his 1888 presidential race against Grover Cleveland, responded in kind to similarly provoke partisan reaction. Harrison's "When Grover Goes Marching Home", attacked the legitimacy of Cleveland's children in order to win voter affection.

Bipartisan recognition of campaign songs' well-suited use for dissemination of harsh and unsubstantiated rhetoric has been covered extensively by historians investigating early US campaign songs. Historians have noted that certain campaign "songs trumpeted the virtues of some and assaulted the failings of others", as well as a penchant for "name-calling and grosser trickery" instilled in American conscious of the time. This has been surmised as the "low comedy and lower morals of America's past", all of which reflected a demand to make partisanship "noisy and intimidating".

While used largely in retaliation for other campaign songs, certain songwriters built their platform off of propagating falsehoods without initial provocation. One such example was James K. Polk's campaign songs during the 1844 general election, which included references to Native American leader "approval" despite voting rights and enfranchisement being liminal at the time.

== Resistance and criticism ==
Campaign songs' earliest iterations through the 1800s in the US were used no end for political persuasion and celebration. While recognised and sung as such, campaign songs were also derided in social discourse as being a classifiably political affair, with accusations levelled at both the 'Whig' and 'Democratic' parties of being disingenuous in their employment of highly charged rhetoric. Whigs were criticized for their reliance upon campaign songs to enter the White House, resultant in the eventual election of "Whig" William Henry Harrison to the presidency on a platform backed heavily by campaign songs in 1840. While Democrats themselves were criticised for their lagging, reactionary use of songs to propagate their messages, almost exclusively smear-based, amounting to criticism of message rather than method.

Criticisms of campaign and political songs also attacked the denying of independent thought, and the encouragement of group-think. Opposition to early campaign and political songs included calls for "dismissal of all the songs and toasts calculated to enslave", which ultimately operated to "suffocate reflection". This is part of a plethora of early, post-Declaration of Independence, formative, critical literature surrounding the establishment and function of US governance, and the importance of political representation and diversity.

Hunters of Kentucky
Jackson supporters used this Battle of New Orleans anthem as their campaign song.

Tippecanoe and Tyler too
As used in the 1840 campaign.

== See also ==
- List of songs used for presidential campaigns in the United States
