= The Old Settler =

Mountain in British Columbia, Canada

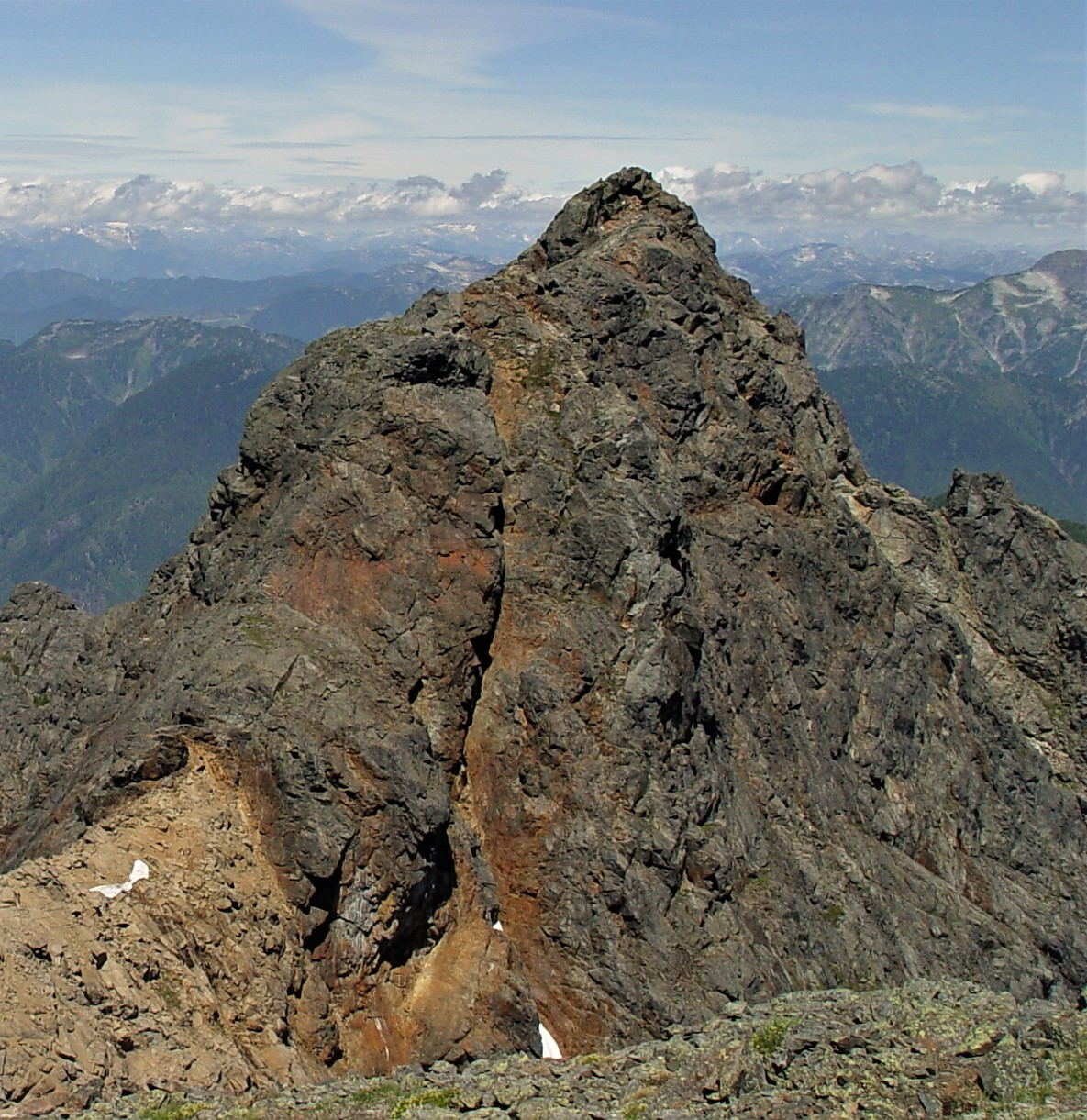
- Summit, south aspect

Highest point
- Elevation: 2,132 m (6,995 ft)
- Prominence: 1,232 m (4,042 ft)
- Isolation: 31.92 km (19.83 mi)
- Coordinates: 49°30′43″N 121°37′18″W

Geography
- Location within British Columbia Location within Canada
- Country: Canada
- Province: British Columbia
- District: Yale Division Yale Land District
- Parent range: Lillooet Ranges; Coast Mountains
- Topo map: NTS 92H12 Mount Urquhart

Geology
- Rock type: Granodiorite

The Old Settler, elevation 2,132 m (6,995 ft), is the highest mountain in the southernmost part of the Lillooet Ranges of the Coast Mountains in British Columbia, Canada, located between the Fraser Canyon (E) and Harrison Lake (W) to the northeast of the town of Agassiz between Bear and Cogburn Creeks.

== See also ==
- Old Settler's Song (Acres of Clams)
- Old Settlers' Association
- Geography of British Columbia
