= William Henry Harrison 1840 presidential campaign =

United States presidential campaign

"Tippecanoe and Tyler Too!"
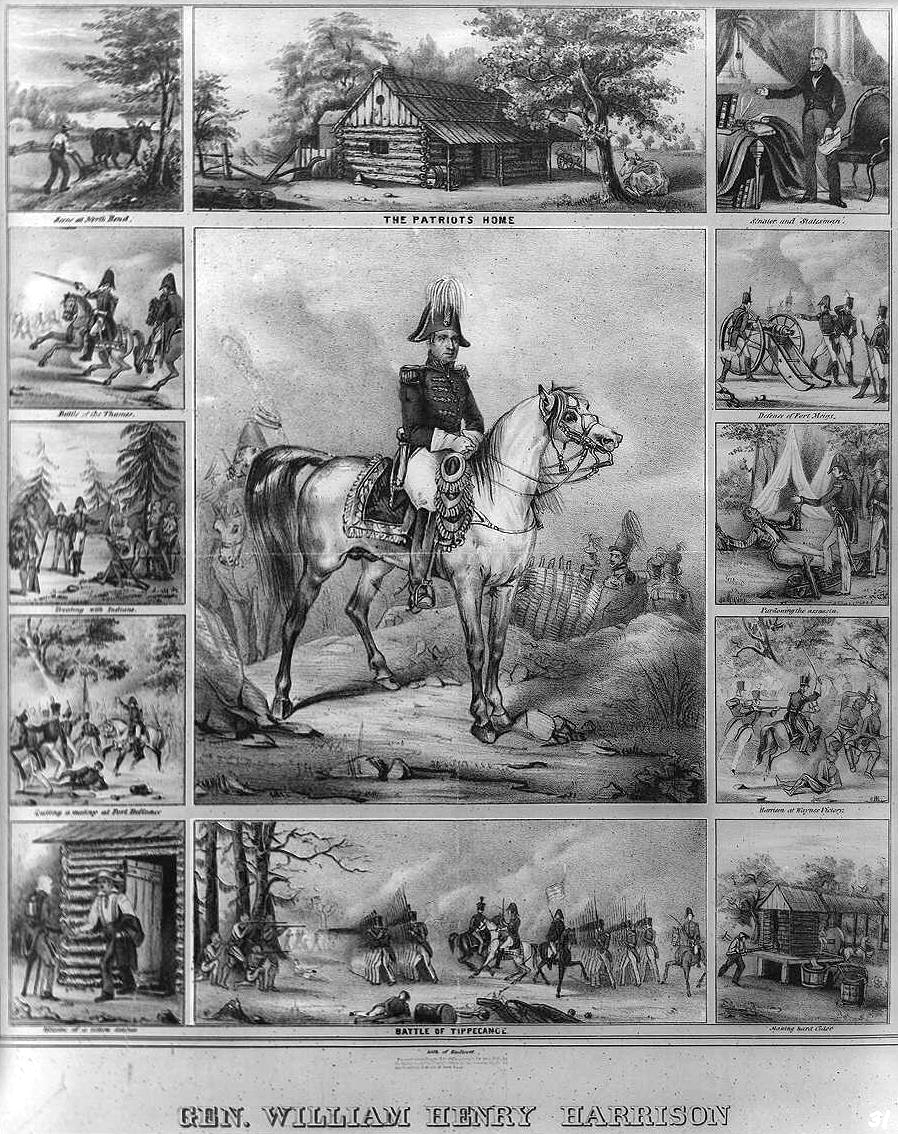
- Campaign: 1840 U.S. presidential election
- Candidate: William Henry Harrison; U.S. senator from Ohio (1825–1828); John Tyler; U.S. senator from Virginia (1827–1836)
- Affiliation: Whig Party
- Status: Elected
- Key people: Thurlow Weed, New York political boss Thaddeus Stevens, Pennsylvania Whig leader Horace Greeley, editor, The Log Cabin campaign paper Daniel Webster, Henry Clay, John Bear ("the Buckeye Blacksmith"), campaign speakers

In 1840, William Henry Harrison was elected President of the United States. Harrison, who had served as a general and as United States Senator from Ohio, defeated the incumbent president, Democrat Martin Van Buren, in a campaign that broke new ground in American politics. Among other firsts, Harrison's victory was the first time the Whig Party won a presidential election. A month after taking office, Harrison died and his running mate John Tyler served the remainder of his term, but broke from the Whig agenda, and was expelled from the party.

Harrison was born into wealth in 1773. He started a military career before using his father Benjamin Harrison V's connections to gain office on the frontier. After a decade as governor of Indiana Territory, Harrison made his reputation fighting the Native Americans, notably at the 1811 Battle of Tippecanoe and, once the War of 1812 began, the British. He was triumphant over both at the Battle of the Thames in 1813. After the war, he was elected to Congress from Ohio and served in a variety of offices over the next two decades. A regional Whig candidate for the White House in 1836, he finished second to Van Buren and did not stop running for president until he won the office four years later.

One of three presidential candidates at the December 1839 Whig National Convention, Harrison gained the nomination over Henry Clay and General Winfield Scott on the fifth ballot. At home, far from the convention in an era of primitive communications, Harrison played no part in the selection of Tyler as running mate. After the convention, a Democratic paper in Baltimore suggested that if offered a pension and some hard cider to drink in a log cabin, Harrison would turn aside from his campaign. The Whigs adopted the cabin and cider as emblems, both of which were commonly seen (and, in the case of cider, drunk) at their rallies, and became symbolic of the party's connection with the grass roots. Harrison rallies grew to unprecedented size, and the candidate delivered speeches at some of them, breaking the usual custom that the office should seek the man and presidential hopefuls should not campaign.

The carnival atmosphere attracted many voters at a time when there was little public entertainment, and the Whig ticket won easy majorities in both the popular and electoral vote. Harrison was inaugurated in March 1841; his death a month later marked the first time an American president had failed to complete his term. While some historians view Harrison's victorious campaign askance because of the role emotion played in it, others note how it originated techniques used in later presidential races. The unofficial campaign motto, "Tippecanoe and Tyler Too", has been called the most famous presidential campaign slogan in American history.

== Background ==
=== William Henry Harrison and Tippecanoe ===
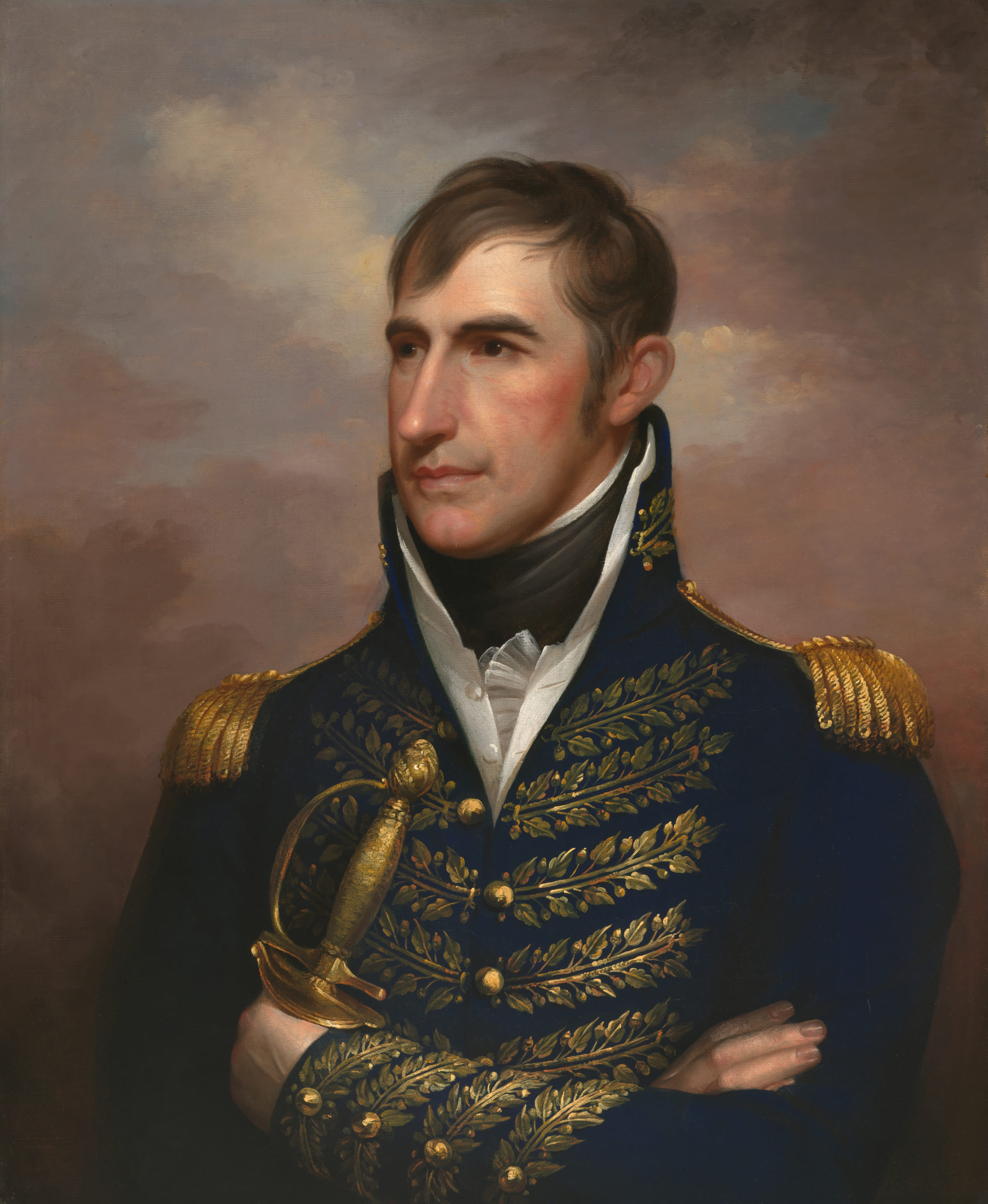
Portrait of Harrison by Rembrandt Peale

William Henry Harrison was born on February 9, 1773, on Berkeley Plantation in Charles City County, Virginia. His father was the wealthy and influential Benjamin Harrison, a signer of the Declaration of Independence and Governor of Virginia. Houseguests at Berkeley while Harrison was a child included George Washington, Thomas Jefferson and Patrick Henry. Harrison was sent to Hampden-Sydney College in 1787, where he developed a lifelong interest in Roman history, and then to Philadelphia to learn medicine from Dr. Benjamin Rush, including study at the University of Pennsylvania. (Note: The only U.S. president to have been a student at Penn until Donald Trump in 2017.)

Benjamin Harrison died in 1791. William Henry dropped the study of medicine and used Benjamin's connections with the Founding Fathers to get a commission in the Army. The seat of the federal government was then in Philadelphia, and President Washington granted him a commission. Harrison served under Mad Anthony Wayne, fighting against Native Americans in what is now western Ohio. He was promoted to captain and made commander of Fort Washington before returning to civilian life in 1798, disliking garrison duty. He was already seeking another position through his government connections, and the same year was appointed by President John Adams as secretary of the Northwest Territory. The following year, the territorial legislature narrowly elected him the territory's delegate to Congress. In 1800, the Indiana Territory was separated from the Northwest, and Harrison was made territorial governor by President Adams, a position he would hold for over a decade. Prior to taking office, he bought a large tract of land from his father-in-law, along the Ohio River at North Bend. When Harrison purchased it, there was a log cabin on the property, but by 1840 the structure had been absorbed into the mansion that stood there.

On the instructions of the presidents he served under, Governor Harrison secured as much land as he could from the Indians for white settlement, sometimes loaning chiefs money and taking the land when they could not repay, or finding compliant "leaders" when chiefs would not sell. This led to increased tensions between natives and settlers. In late 1810, an influential Native American, Tecumseh came to confront Harrison at the territorial capital of Vincennes, telling the governor there could be no more land taken. The meeting ended badly, and Tecumseh began gathering warriors at Prophetstown. After there were raids, Federal authorities gave Harrison permission to destroy Prophetstown, and in late 1811, with Tecumseh away recruiting, Harrison led about 1,000 federal troops and Kentucky militia on a 150-mile (240 km) march to there.

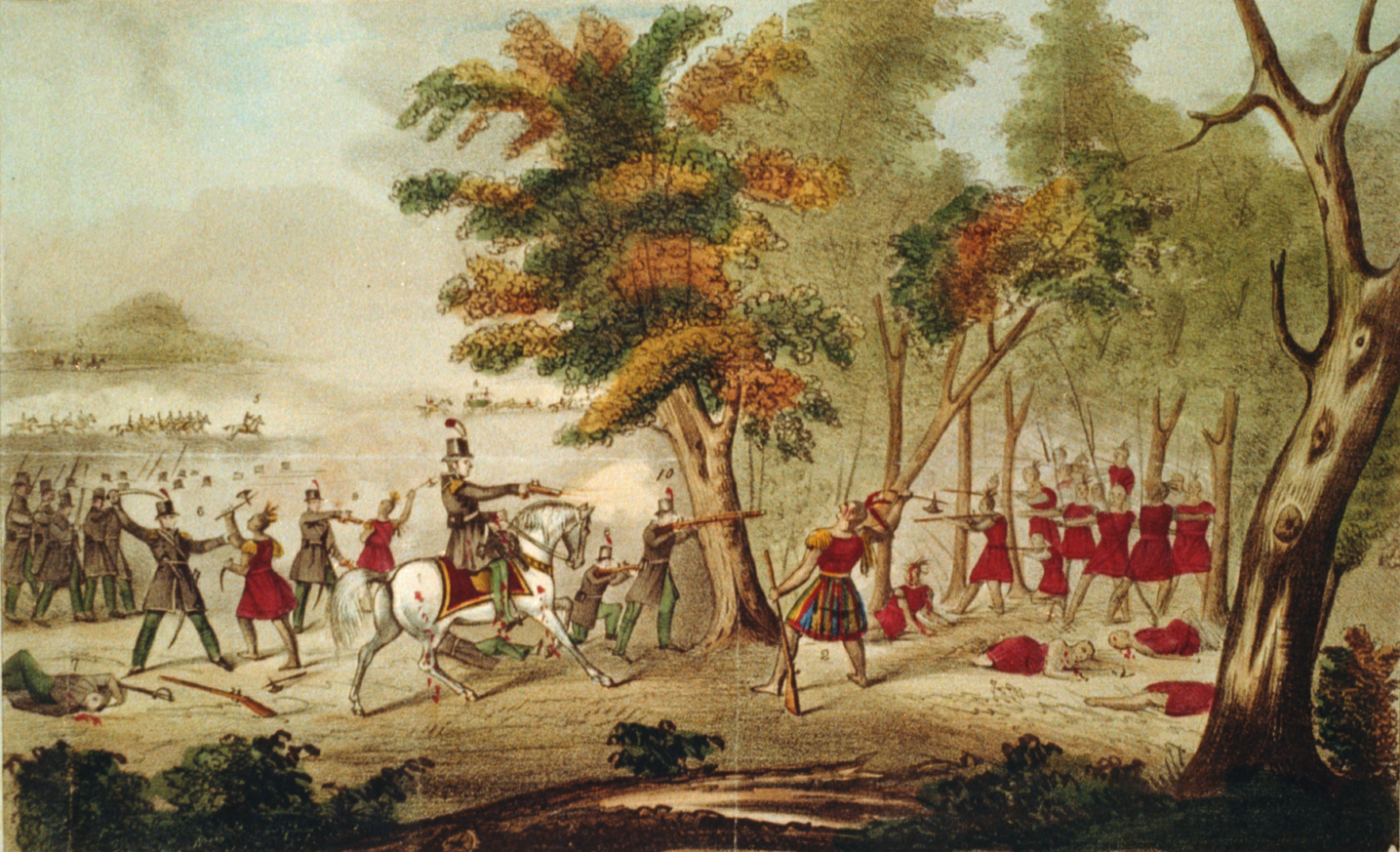
Early depiction of the Battle of the Thames, showing Tecumseh being shot. On the horse is Colonel Richard Mentor Johnson.

On the night of November 6, 1811, Harrison's troops camped on a ridge overlooking Prophetstown. The Indians attacked before dawn. U.S. troops, though taken by surprise, repelled the attack after two hours in what came to be called the Battle of Tippecanoe and proceeded to destroy Prophetstown. Harrison's forces suffered heavy casualties, which did not stop him from quickly becoming known as the "Hero of Tippecanoe".

After the War of 1812 began, the Indians allied with the British. Harrison remained in the West (resigning as governor to accept a military commission in 1812), but was unable to make much headway against the alliance due to British naval superiority on Lake Erie. Once those ships were defeated by Commodore Oliver Hazard Perry in the Battle of Lake Erie (1813), Harrison attacked his foes, and in the Battle of the Thames on October 5, 1813, in present-day Ontario, Harrison's troops won the day. Tecumseh was killed and U.S. control of Detroit (which Harrison had taken from the retreating British) was not threatened in the remainder of the war. Harrison was hailed as a hero by many. Even so, his military record was quickly contentious, as some castigated him for not ordering that a palisade be built around his camp at Tippecanoe, which would have made it more difficult for the Indians to take his forces by surprise, and his record remained controversial in 1840.

=== Candidate in 1836 ===
Harrison's military career was an asset to him in his postwar political ventures. He was elected to Congress from Ohio in 1816 to fill a vacancy, subsequently winning a full two-year term. He served a brief term in the U.S. Senate, but also failed in two other bids for the House of Representatives and one for Governor of Ohio. In 1828, President John Quincy Adams appointed him minister to Gran Colombia, but he was recalled as Andrew Jackson instituted his "spoils system" the following year.

Harrison lost a bid for the Senate in 1831, and found insufficient support to mount a run for the House of Representatives in 1832. His large family gave him money problems, and he remained out of public life in the early 1830s. By 1834, opposition to President Jackson was coalescing into what became known as the Whig Party. Harrison, though several years out of active politics was a war hero with roots in both North and South, and had been fired by Jackson. Thus, he looked attractive as a possible presidential candidate to the new party, something Harrison did nothing to discourage. Harrison wrote a letter to the newspapers that won over many Whigs, assuring them of his fidelity to party principles, such as the limited power of the executive and federal subsidies for roads, canals and railroads.

The Whig Party was still seeking to build its state organizations, and seeing little chance of winning the presidency in 1836, ran regional candidates for president. The plan was that a presidential candidate who was popular locally, even if he did not win, might boost the Whig vote for state offices. Some hoped the group of candidates might deny Jackson's chosen successor, Vice President Martin Van Buren a majority in the Electoral College. Harrison was known by then more as a war hero than as a politician, as memories of his time in Congress had faded. As state Whig parties chose their presidential candidates by convention or caucus, the other major Whig presidential candidate from the North, Massachusetts Senator Daniel Webster was defeated by Harrison in most states, eventually getting to run only in his home state. Harrison made a trip from Ohio to Virginia, ostensibly to visit relatives, resulting in a long series of receptions and dinners. Harrison gave speeches, but as these were nominally in thanks for his welcome, they did not violate the custom at the time that the office should seek the man, and that presidential candidates should not indulge in electioneering. Harrison was the leading Whig candidate in the 1836 election, taking seven states and 73 electoral votes, but he and the other two popular-vote candidates (Webster and Hugh Lawson White of Tennessee) could not stop Van Buren from winning a majority in the Electoral College.

== Nominating convention ==
After the 1836 election, Harrison did not really stop running for president, nor did his supporters stop boosting him—an Ohio political convention endorsed him as early as 1837. His finances were somewhat secured by his appointment as clerk of Hamilton County's court of common pleas, a post that paid no salary but allowed considerable income from fees. The years between 1838 and 1840 were years of personal tragedy for the general, as three of his adult children died and his wife Anna fell seriously ill. Harrison did his best to manage a network of acquaintances and supporters from his home in North Bend, corresponding extensively and seeking to have items favorable to him placed in the newspapers.

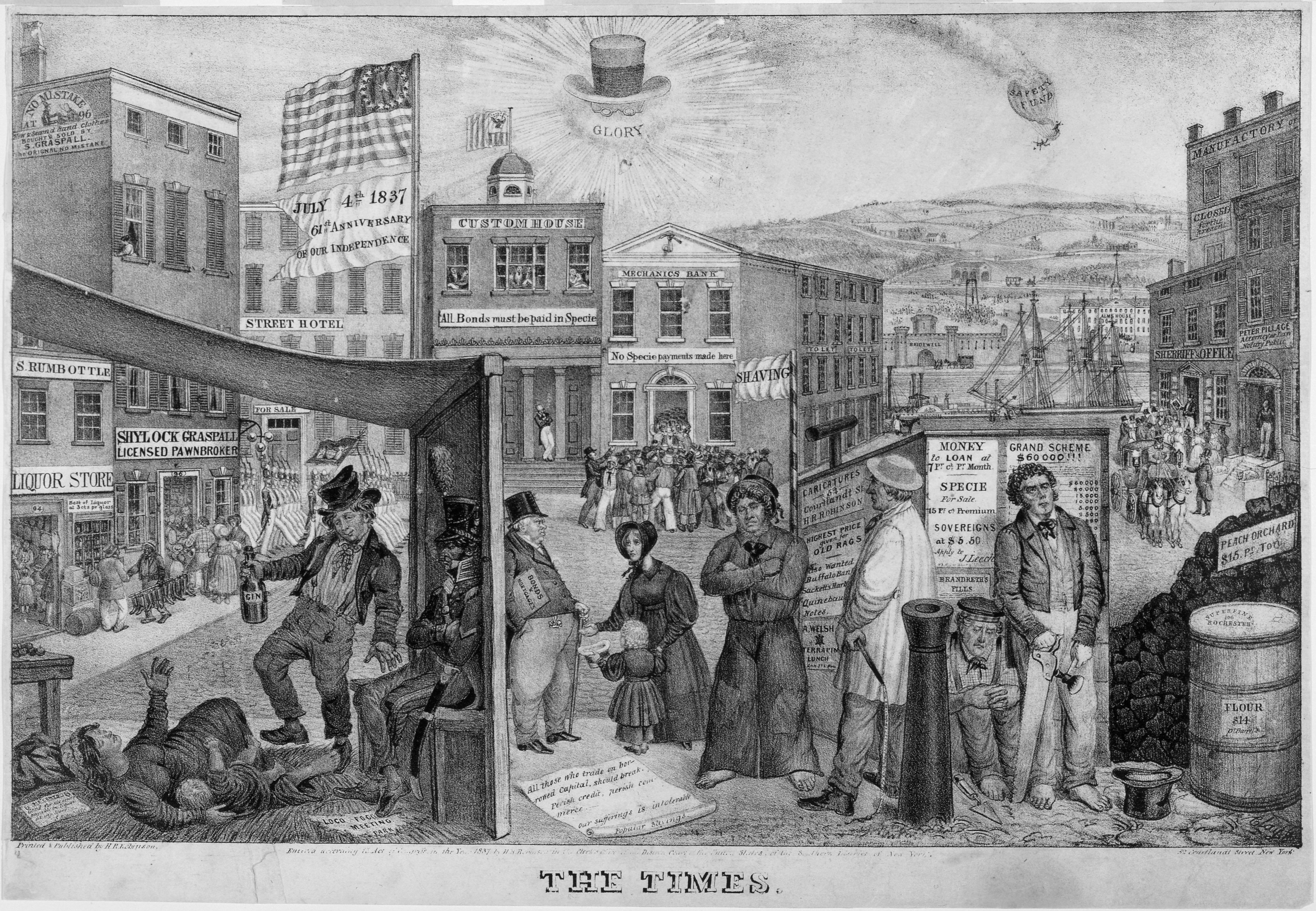
Caricature: aftermath of the Panic of 1837 (hostile to the Democrats)

The Panic of 1837 and the depression that followed caused many to blame Van Buren and his Democratic Party for the hard times, making it more likely that the Whig nominee in 1840 would be the next president. In addition to Harrison and Webster, Senator Henry Clay of Kentucky sought the nomination, as did General Winfield Scott. Some Whigs argued that because the depression was driving many to their ranks, there was no need to nominate a relative outsider such as Harrison; the party could win behind one of its statesmen, Clay or Webster, and by 1838, Clay was the frontrunner. A slaveholder, he commanded the near-united support of the South, though this came at the price of alienating many Northern Whigs. There was wide consensus in the party that a national convention was needed to decide on a presidential candidate, and in late 1837, the Whig congressional caucus agreed to work with the state parties to organize a convention. After considerable maneuvering, a convention to nominate candidates for president and vice president was called by the congressional caucus in May 1838, to be held at Harrisburg, Pennsylvania, beginning on December 4, 1839. Having failed to gain much support, Webster dropped out of the race in June 1839.

The Whig National Convention opened on December 4, 1839, almost a year before the general election. The candidates did not travel to the convention, and with no telegraph yet in operation, they did not learn of events in Harrisburg until the convention was over. Each state was allocated two votes for each member of the House of Representatives and Senate it was entitled to send to Washington. There were four absent states from the South, which hurt Clay. The rules of the convention, once passed by the delegates, also hurt Clay, since they provided that the entirety of a state's vote would be cast as a majority of the delegation directed, negating Clay's sizable minorities in Northern states such as New York. That state's delegation was run by its Whig boss, Thurlow Weed, who deemed Clay unelectable as a slaveholder. New York provided much of Scott's vote through the first four ballots, which were deadlocked with Clay ahead but not close to a majority. Pennsylvania's Thaddeus Stevens, a leader of the Harrison forces, had obtained possession of a letter Scott had written expressing sympathy for abolitionists. Stevens intentionally dropped the letter while walking among the pro-Clay Virginia delegation. After reading it, the Virginians announced Harrison was their second choice, setting off a stampede for him, and he became the Whig nominee for president on the fifth ballot.

Harrison's convention managers sought a Southerner as vice presidential candidate, to balance the ticket. Clay disciples such as John M. Clayton of Delaware, Willie Mangum of North Carolina and Virginia's Benjamin Watkins Leigh were discussed, but all of Clay's close associates refused or were believed to be unwilling to run. Former senator John Tyler of Virginia, a onetime Democrat who had broken with Jackson over states' rights, had been a regional Whig candidate for vice president in 1836, and had supported Clay at the convention. Harrison, out of communication in distant North Bend, was not consulted. Weed's assistant, Horace Greeley, later claimed Tyler had wept at Clay's defeat, and this had gotten him the nomination. The vote was unanimous, but Virginia's ballots were not cast. Diarist Philip Hone, following President Harrison's death after a month in office in 1841, would write of Tyler's nomination, "there was rhyme, but no reason to it." Michael F. Holt, who in his history of the Whig Party chronicled President Tyler's departure from it, noted, "the choice of Tyler would later prove to be a disaster."

For the remainder of the convention, delegates continued to try to conciliate the Clay supporters. A number of speeches were made in tribute to the Kentucky senator, and attendees roared with approval when a pre-written letter from Clay was read, expressing support for the nominee, whoever it might be. The magnanimous tone of the letter contrasted with Clay's reaction when on December 8, the day after the convention closed, he became the first Whig presidential hopeful to learn the outcome: "My [political] friends are not worth the powder and shot it would take to kill them."

=== Balloting ===
The state-by-state roll call was printed in the Farmer's Cabinet newspaper on December 13, 1839:

Convention vote
Presidential vote	1	2	3	4	5	Vice presidential vote	1
William Henry Harrison	94	94	91	91	148	John Tyler	231
Henry Clay	103	103	95	95	90	Abstaining	23
Winfield Scott	57	57	68	68	16		

== Campaign ==
=== Hard cider and log cabins (December 1839 to March 1840) ===
Harrison accepted his nomination in a letter dated December 19, 1839. At age 66 then (67 by the election), he was the oldest presidential candidate to that point. He pledged to serve only one term, but was vague about other stances, writing that his public career made stating his positions unnecessary. There was no party platform; most Whigs did not favor binding candidates to a legislative plan. If the Whigs did not leave Harrisburg completely united, they achieved this within weeks of the convention. A testimonial dinner to Senator Clay in Washington on December 11, attended by convention delegates and other politicians, healed many wounds, and a series of huge public meetings, held to ratify the nominations of Harrison and Tyler, showed the Whigs willing to put the nomination fight behind them.

The Democratic press was unimpressed by Harrison's nomination, and attacked him for not publishing his views on the main issues of the day, dubbing him "General Mum". The New York Herald mocked the aging general, "Mrs. Harrison of Ohio is undoubtedly a very excellent matron for her time, but if we must take a woman president, let's have youth and beauty, and not age and imbecility." John de Ziska, Washington correspondent for the Baltimore Republican (a Democratic paper) who wrote under the initial Z, alleged that one particularly embittered Clayite had wondered how to "get rid of" Harrison, and the paper printed Z's suggestion: "Give him a barrel of hard cider, and settle a pension of two thousand a year on him, and my word for it, he will sit the remainder of his days in his log cabin by the side of a 'sea coal' fire, and study moral philosophy." This gibe was quickly reprinted by other Democratic papers.

The taunt hit home in an America where the log cabin was seen as part of the national heritage; though relatively few lived in one by 1840, many had resided in one earlier in life, or had parents who had. Alexis de Tocqueville, the French diplomat who toured America in the 1830s, chronicled them as the pioneer's first dwelling. Hard cider was seen as a drink of the common man. The Whigs decided to take pride in the cabin and cider the Democrats had derided. The origins of how this came to be are uncertain, though the most commonly rendered version of events has, in January 1840, Pennsylvania Whig operative Thomas Elder coming up with the idea of making log cabins a symbol of the Harrison/Tyler campaign. Robert Gray Gunderson, in his account of the 1840 election, described how one was displayed at a Harrisburg ratification meeting on January 20, and "within the month, cabins, [rac]coons, and cider became symbols of resurgent Whiggery." John Gasaway, in his doctoral thesis on communications in the 1840 campaign, noted that Harrison was called the "log cabin and hard cider candidate" in one paper as early as December 20, 1839, and that images of Harrison and humble abodes he was deemed to have protected date as far back as the War of 1812.

An early casualty of Harrison's 1840 campaign was Democratic Michigan Congressman Isaac Crary who on February 14, 1840, as the House of Representatives debated funding for the Cumberland Road, essayed an attack on Harrison's record as an Indian fighter, deeming him a bogus hero. Crary sat down to applause from his fellow Democrats. But the next day, Ohio's Thomas Corwin, known as a humorist, rose in the House, and depicted Crary, a militia general in his home state, having to deal with the terrors of the militia's parade day, until afterwards, safe with the survivors, "your general unsheathes his trenchant blade ... and with an energy and remorseless fury he slices the watermelons that lie in heaps around him." As word reached newspapers in February and March, there was much amusement across the nation; Crary failed to be renominated to Congress.

By the time of the Ohio Whig Convention in Columbus on February 22, the theme and enthusiasm had taken full hold. Tens of thousands of delegates and spectators filled the streets as a mile-long parade featured log cabins on wheels, with the builders drinking hard cider on the roof, and giant wooden canoes with the image of Old Tippecanoe, though General Harrison was not in attendance. Many of those who came to Columbus dressed as pioneers, in buckskins with coonskin cap. Barrels of hard cider were provided on every corner. Serious business was accomplished; the national ticket was endorsed and Congressman Corwin nominated for governor. Thirty thousand people attended; "no political rally like this had ever taken place in America."

"Tippecanoe and Tyler Too"
All twelve verses.

Abbreviated version
First verse and chorus.

The 1820s and 1830s had seen a large increase in the franchise in the United States, which by 1840 was granted to many white males, even poor men, and the Whigs sought to recruit among new voters. There was concern that the Harrison campaign would not be able to keep up momentum, but supporters proved inventive. Some Clevelanders who had journeyed to Columbus had made a gigantic paper ball, 10 foot (3.0 m) in diameter, with pro-Harrison and anti-Van Buren slogans written on it. As a newly coined phrase went, they kept the ball rolling, taking it from town to town. This inspired a Harrison supporter from Zanesville, Ohio, Alexander Coffman Ross to write new lyrics to an old minstrel song called "Little Pigs", which immediately became a huge hit. In so doing, Ross coined what Shafer called "the first—and the most famous—slogan of any presidential campaign", for the song began,

What has caused this great commotion, motion, motion
Our country through?
It is the ball a-rolling on,
For Tippecanoe and Tyler too,
Tippecanoe and Tyler too ...

=== Keeping the ball rolling (April to August 1840) ===
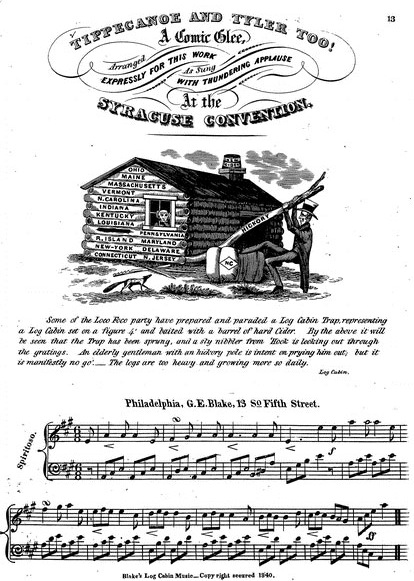

The campaign was generally administered by a group of Whig congressmen in Washington, including Clay, who pooled their mailing lists; there were organizations in each county tasked with running the local campaign and getting out the vote. Much work was also done by the new political bosses, like Thurlow Weed of New York, who also took charge of much of the fundraising. Greeley, by then editor of the widely circulated Harrison campaign journal, The Log Cabin, worried that the constant demands for money would drive the wealthy from politics; this did not occur. Much of the money came from those, such as land speculators, who would benefit from the internal improvements to transportation that were backed by the Whigs. Funding for local operations was expected to be raised locally, sometimes through arrangements like kickbacks from Pennsylvania canal contractors, something implemented by Thaddeus Stevens. Erie Canal workers were expected to pay a toll to Weed to finance Whig operations. Feeling every hand was needed to defeat Van Buren, Whig leaders allowed women to help: although they could not vote, they could influence men. This was the first time an American political party included women in campaign activities on a widespread scale.

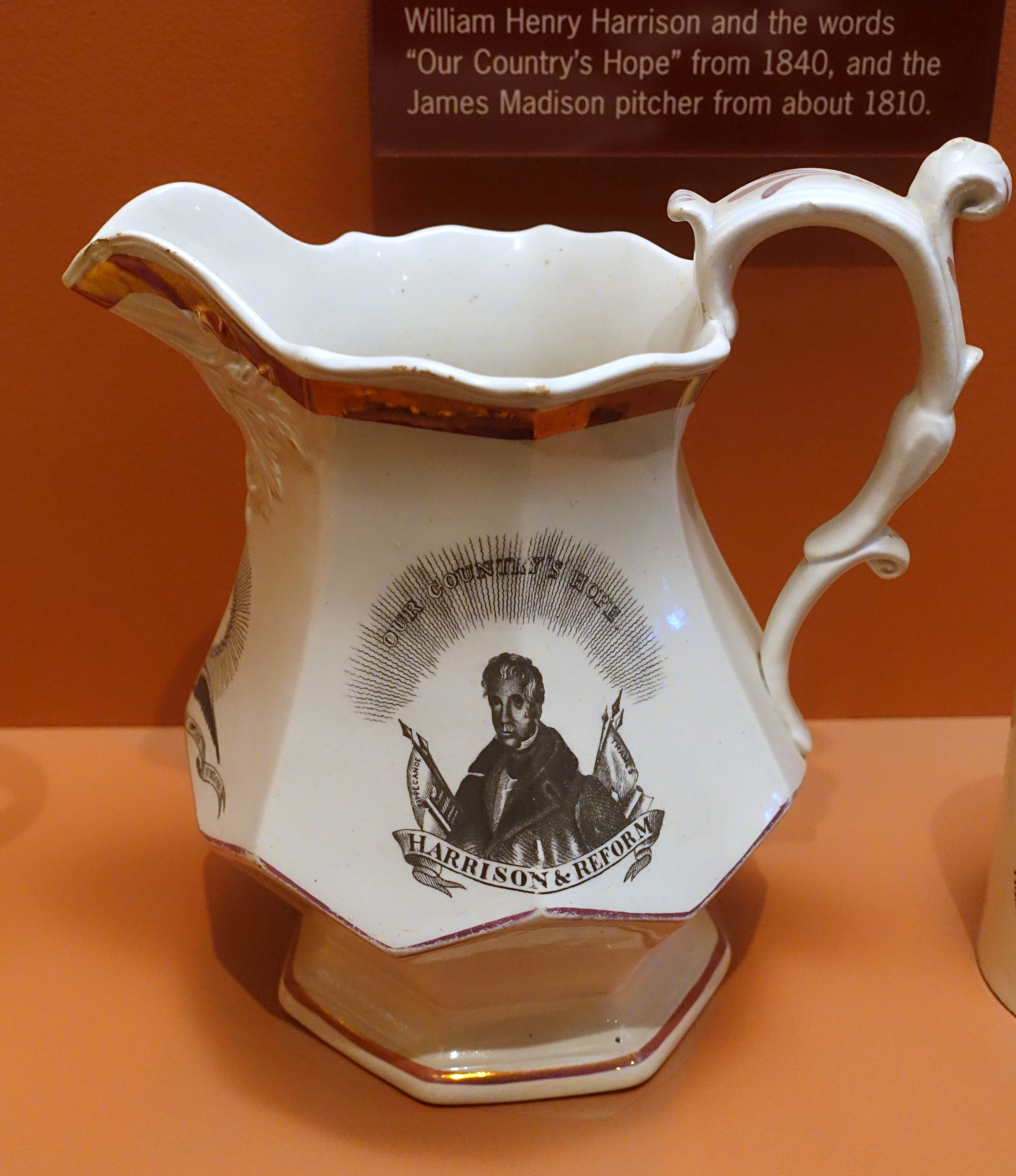
Pitcher from the 1840 campaign bearing Harrison's portrait

In April, the Whigs used the House of Representatives for an attack on President Van Buren. Charles Ogle of Pennsylvania, a law student and political disciple of Thaddeus Stevens, utilized a debate on White House renovations to spend three days accusing Van Buren of living in luxury at considerable public expense: "If he is vain enough to spend his money in the purchase of rubies for his neck, diamond rings for his fingers, Brussels lace for his breast, filet gloves for his hands, and fabrique de broderies de bougram à Nancy handkerchiefs for his pocket—if he chooses to lay out hundreds of dollars in supplying his toilet with 'Double Extract of Queen Victoria', Eau de Cologne, Corinthian Oil of Cream ... if, I say, Mr. Van Buren sees fit to spend his cash in buying these and other perfumes and cosmetics for his toilet, it can constitute no valid reason for charging the farmers, laborers and mechanics of this country with bills for HEMMING HIS DISH RAGS, FOR HIS LARDING NEEDLES, LIQUOR STANDS, AND FOREIGN CUT WINE COOLERS." Democrats called Ogle's address the "Omnibus of Lies"; Whigs called it the "Gold Spoons speech" and reprinted it in large numbers, attempting to paint Van Buren, who was in fact of far more humble birth than Harrison, as an aristocratic dandy being challenged by a man of the people.

The 1840 Democratic National Convention opened at Baltimore's Music Hall on May 4, 1840. A subdued affair, it was greatly overshadowed by a huge "Whig Young Men" gathering that took place in Baltimore at the same time, featuring speeches by Senators Clay and Webster. President Van Buren was nominated for a second term, but the convention made no endorsement for vice president. The incumbent, Richard Mentor Johnson of Kentucky was controversial because he had lived with an African American woman and had tried to introduce their children into society, and the influential former president, Andrew Jackson, insisted that Johnson be dumped from the ticket. Johnson, who had fought under Harrison during the War of 1812, was popular in the western states as an Indian fighter (he was alleged to be the one who killed Tecumseh), and Van Buren stalled. The lack of an endorsement left the matter up to state parties, and Johnson's rivals soon withdrew, leaving him as the de facto vice presidential candidate.

The huge crowds that Harrison's campaign events attracted were unprecedented, though Jackson's campaigns for the presidency had seen rallies on a smaller scale. These gatherings both promoted the Whig ticket and were themselves entertainment for the participants, thus attracting even more attendees; as New York Governor William H. Seward, a Whig, put it, "nothing attracts a crowd so rapidly as the knowledge that there is a crowd already." The Democrats were shocked by the outpouring of support, with Pennsylvania Senator James Buchanan noting that the people had "abandoned their ordinary business for the purpose of electioneering". As the log cabin theme took hold, alternative nicknames for Harrison such as "Old Buckeye" were dropped, and Whigs, heretofore more associated with the wealthier classes, sought to appeal to the humbly-born. Senator Webster, in his speeches, regretted that he was not born in a log cabin (his older siblings were), but he told of annual pilgrimages to the old cabin with his children to instill its values in them.

Former Postmaster General Amos Kendall, who managed Van Buren's re-election campaign, instructed that Democrats should not try to defend the administration but attack the opposition's candidate. By the end of May 1840, Harrison had made no public appearances that year. Even though there was a custom that presidential contenders did not campaign, he was still mocked by the Democratic press. One article alleged he had been shut up in an iron cage with a mug of hard cider, and that he was seeking help from the abolitionists to get released. As was usual for candidates of that era, he made his views known by answering letters from citizens, knowing some would be reproduced in newspapers. Harrison, however, felt the need to speak out and accepted an invitation to make an address at the June 13 commemoration of the 1813 Siege of Fort Meigs, where he and his troops had held out against British and Native American forces. En route to Perrysburg, when leaving his hotel in Columbus, he made what Shafer called "the first presidential campaign speech in history", speaking to a small crowd of supporters, and defending his record against what he deemed personal attacks. In his Fort Meigs speech, Harrison told the crowd, "See that the Government does not acquire too much power. Keep check upon your rulers. Do this, and liberty is safe." Harrison had planned additional speeches, but his swing was cut short when news arrived of the death of his son Benjamin from tuberculosis. He returned home to take care of his wife, Anna Harrison, and did not make another speech until July 28.

Lines had been hardening on the matter of slavery, and Democrats accused Harrison of being an abolitionist because of his membership, a half century earlier, in the Richmond Humane Society, an anti-slavery group; he had posted a mixed record on the issue while in Congress. On August 20, he gave a speech on the slave question at Carthage, Ohio, saying what happened regarding slavery in a state was that state's business alone. He ignored the question of slavery in the District of Columbia and in the territories, both under the jurisdiction of the federal government. The general had pledged that his door would always be open to his old soldiers, but others came as well, and he hosted an unending series of guests. This was especially difficult for him on Sundays, when Anna Harrison forbade political discussion. The economy continued to be poor in 1840, a fact the Whigs never ceased to press, arguing that Van Buren had done little and Harrison's inauguration was needed to put a stop to the hard times.

=== Final days (September to November 1840) ===
Harrison's health was a minor campaign issue; it was presented by the Whigs as robust, and by Democrats as decrepit. The campaign released a letter from his doctor, testifying to his good health; this was a presidential election first. Another testament to Harrison's health was his speeches: he gave 24 addresses between June and October, all in Ohio and lasting up to three hours; Van Buren did not give any. Harrison did not have the campaign trail to himself; Vice President Johnson told Van Buren the President should "go out among the voters as I intended doing". Democrats tried to paint Johnson as the true hero of the Battle of the Thames, but the Vice President refused to criticize Harrison's conduct in combat. Nevertheless, Johnson spoke with such enthusiasm that he may have set off a riot in Cleveland, and was followed onto the trail late in the campaign by John Tyler, who had difficulty staying on message and resorted to telling questioners, "I am in favor of what General Harrison and Mr. Clay are in favor of."

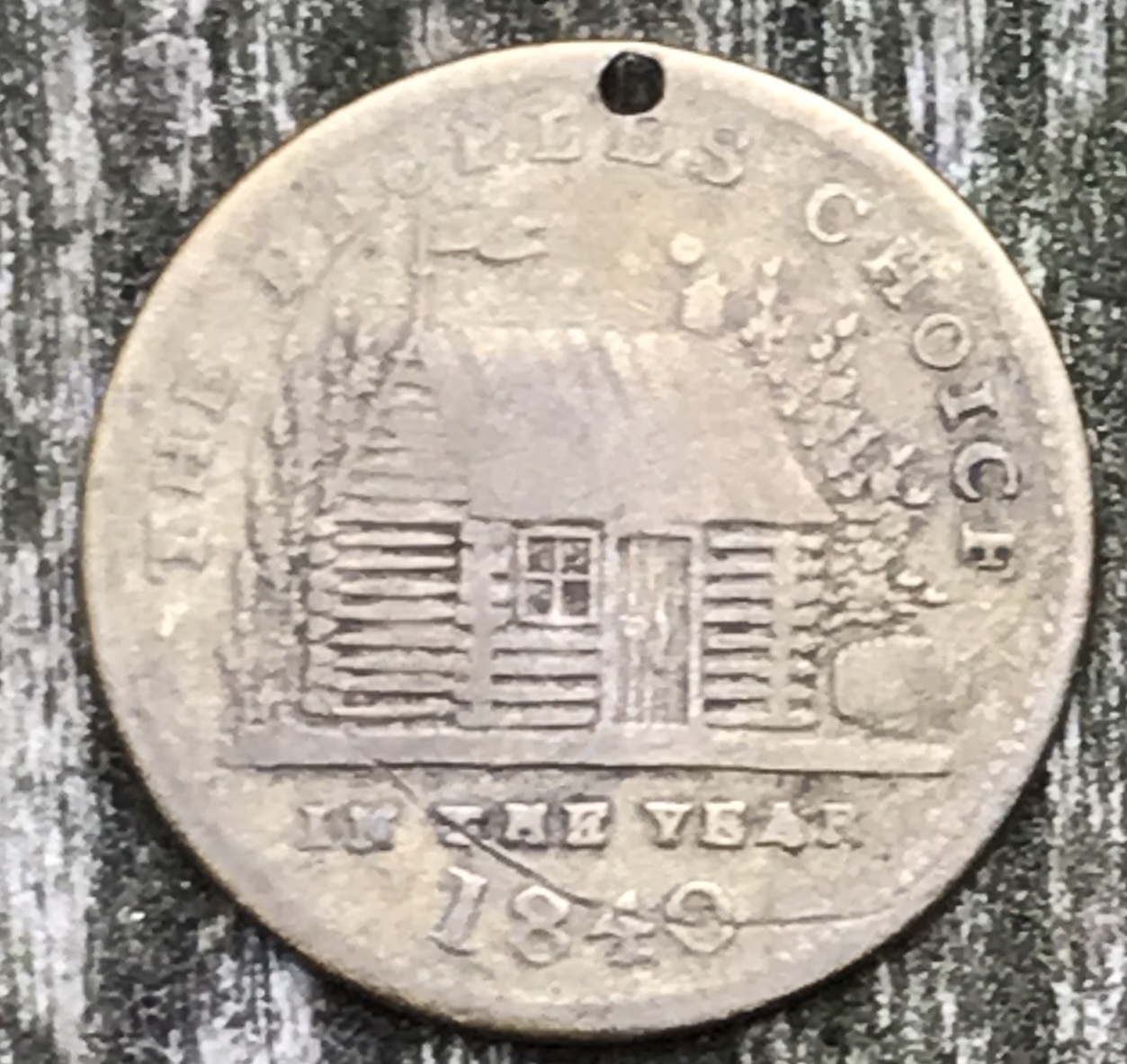
Harrison token from the 1840 campaign

Clay and Webster were at the head of perhaps 5,000 Whig speakers who criss-crossed the nation in Harrison's cause. Clay was unenthusiastic about the idea of being a stump speaker, but warmed to it as he sought to boost himself to be Whig presidential candidate in 1844 (Harrison had promised to serve only one term), and spoke widely, especially in the South, though he mentioned Harrison infrequently. Another prominent speaker was a Whig state assemblyman from Illinois and candidate for presidential elector from that state, Abraham Lincoln, who spoke to a crowd of 15,000 in Springfield, Illinois, wearing jeans. The aristocratic South Carolina former congressman, Hugh Legare also spoke widely, and took to wearing a coonskin cap on the campaign trail, drinking hard cider as he partied with the "Log Cabin Boys". John Bear, the "Buckeye Blacksmith", from South Bloomfield, Ohio, was a prominent Whig speaker. After making a hit in his first speech outside his home town at the February Columbus rally, the Whigs sent him on the road as a person who could appeal to the tradesmen and farmers who made up much of the electorate. He also got to associate with the elite, meeting Harrison at North Bend and attending a party at the Washington home of former president John Quincy Adams. Bear made 331 speeches, the most of any Whig surrogate, and inspired other craftsmen like Henry Wilson of Massachusetts, the "Natick Cobbler", who would rise to the vice presidency under Grant.

The Democrats had seen the Whigs build log cabins, drink huge amounts of hard cider, hold outsized conventions and publish subsidized newspapers; they asked where the money was coming from to provide such expensive operations. There were no campaign finance disclosure laws in 1840, and the Democrats noted that prominent Whig speakers were paid, "from Daniel Webster down to the traveling Bear". Webster had gone to Britain in 1839, and he was accused by one Democratic newspaper of colluding with the British to spend $5 million given to him to subvert American liberties. Columbus editor Sam Medary wrote to Van Buren that "were it not for the secret influence of money, there would be no contest at all."

The Whigs did well in the state elections held in September, capturing the governorship in traditionally Democratic Maine. On October 14, Jackson weighed in on the race, with a public letter published, "it is my serious belief that if General Harrison should be elected President it will tend to the destruction of our glorious Union and Republican system." Jackson made speeches through his home state of Tennessee on behalf of Van Buren. The Baltimore Republican, originator of the "log cabin" gibe, alleged that Maryland's slaves believed a Harrison victory would see their immediate emancipation.

== Election 1840: Whig victory ==
1840 Electoral Vote Map

There was no nationwide election day in 1840, and many states, by the time they held the presidential vote, had already conducted balloting in local races and for the House of Representatives. One state, South Carolina, did not have a popular vote for president, with electors chosen by the legislature. These state and federal elections, from March to October 1840, led to Whig victories in all but a few states, mainly Democratic strongholds like New Hampshire. Among the victories was that of Whig Governor-elect Corwin in Ohio. The first presidential balloting began on October 29, in Pennsylvania and Ohio, and the polls ended with Rhode Island on November 23. Monday, November 2 was the largest polling day, as twelve states, including New York, voted. As those states compiled the vote, citizens scanned partisan and unreliable newspapers, trying to discern a trend. Even though Harrison led in ten of the first eleven states to report, former president Jackson wrote to Van Buren, "do not believe a word of it. Nor will I believe that you are not elected until I see all the official returns." But when the Whigs took New York by 13,000 votes, it was clear that Harrison and Tyler had won the election.

Harrison won 19 of the 26 states, including New York (home to Van Buren), Kentucky (to Johnson) and Tennessee (Jackson). Van Buren did win in Virginia, the state of birth of both Whig candidates, and in Illinois, with Lincoln defeated for elector. The electoral vote count was 234 for Harrison and 60 for Van Buren, with the popular vote closer at 1,275,390 for Harrison to 1,128,854 for Van Buren. Twelve of the Van Buren electors did not vote for Johnson: eleven (all from South Carolina) chose Littleton W. Tazewell for vice president and one (from Virginia) favored Governor James K. Polk of Tennessee. Turnout was 81 percent of eligible voters, setting a record since surpassed only in 1860 and 1876. The Whigs took both houses of Congress, and a majority of state governorships.

Of the Northern states, Harrison lost only Illinois and New Hampshire; he won his home state of Ohio, and also his home county (Hamilton). Voters in the Kentucky district Johnson once represented in the House of Representatives had backed Van Buren by 1,600 votes in 1836, but favored Harrison by 251 votes in 1840. Both major parties saw an increase in vote, in part because 51 percent more people voted in 1840 than in 1836. The Democrats alleged that Harrison had won the popular vote with bribed and ineligible voters; the Whigs responded by accusing their rivals of being unwilling to accept the will of the people.

== Aftermath ("... and Tyler Too") ==
Even before the returns were in, office seekers descended on North Bend, forcing Harrison to put up with their importunities even at his dinner table. Noted New York Congressman Millard Fillmore, a future Whig president: "I understand they have come down upon General Harrison like a pack of famished wolves, and he has been literally driven from his CASTLE and forced to take refuge in Kentucky." Harrison found Kentucky no haven; he apparently hoped to avoid meeting with Clay, but, as writer Gail Collins put it in her biography of Harrison, the senator "ran him to ground, lassoed him, and took him off to Ashland, his estate". Clay had no desire to be in the Harrison administration himself, but expected to run the government from the Senate, and the visit went pleasantly. The two parted on excellent terms, with Clay under the impression several of his designees would be placed in the new cabinet.

Inauguration of the first Whig president would give that party the opportunity to fill federal jobs for the first time. This proved complicated, and Harrison was called to Washington in mid-January, nearly two months before his March 4, 1841 inaugural date, to be at hand. He made a very public progress from Ohio to Washington, getting little rest along the way: even those Whigs who were not seeking government employment wanted to see and meet the President-elect and celebrations often surrounded his hotel all night. He reached Washington on February 9, his 68th birthday. After consultation with Whig politicians, he filled his cabinet, to the disappointment of some, like Henry Clay, who saw his nominees passed over, and Thaddeus Stevens, who believed he had been promised the position of Postmaster General.

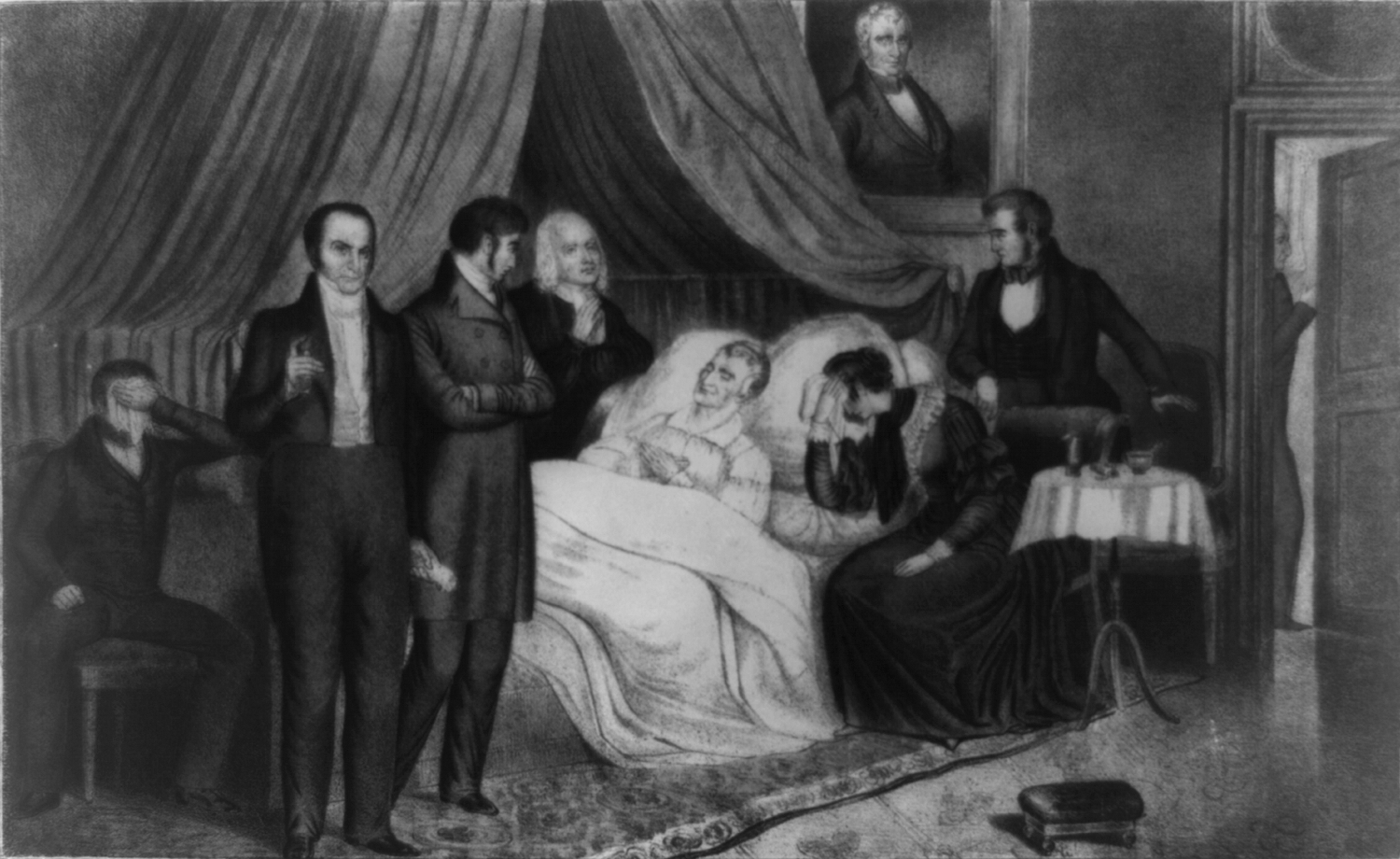
Currier & Ives depiction of the death of Harrison

Harrison allowed Secretary of State-designate Daniel Webster to edit his inauguration speech, but he nevertheless spoke for an hour and 45 minutes, setting a record for verbosity that still stands. As the public was not excluded from the White House, there was no relief from the swarms of office seekers even after March 4, and relations with Clay broke down to such an extent President Harrison banned him from the White House. Clay left town, never to see the President again. Harrison, despite the office seekers, liked to walk to the market each morning but on March 24 got caught in the rain and soon fell ill. The primitive treatment he received, possibly influenced by his own medical training a half-century old, did nothing to improve his condition, and he died in the early morning hours of April 4. Vice President Tyler had returned to his home in Virginia once the Senate adjourned, and Secretary of State Webster sent his son Fletcher to inform Tyler of Harrison's death.

Tyler was not only the first vice president to succeed to the presidency, at age 51 he was the youngest president to that point. One of the main political principles he was guided by was states' rights, and he opposed a national bank, which the Whigs wanted to help develop the country, but which Tyler saw as an imposition on the sovereignty of the states. Tyler vetoed two bills to establish a national bank. Whig leaders, who wanted such a bank, saw political advantage in a breach with him. In September 1841, most of Tyler's cabinet resigned and Whig congressional leaders expelled him from the party.

== Assessment ==
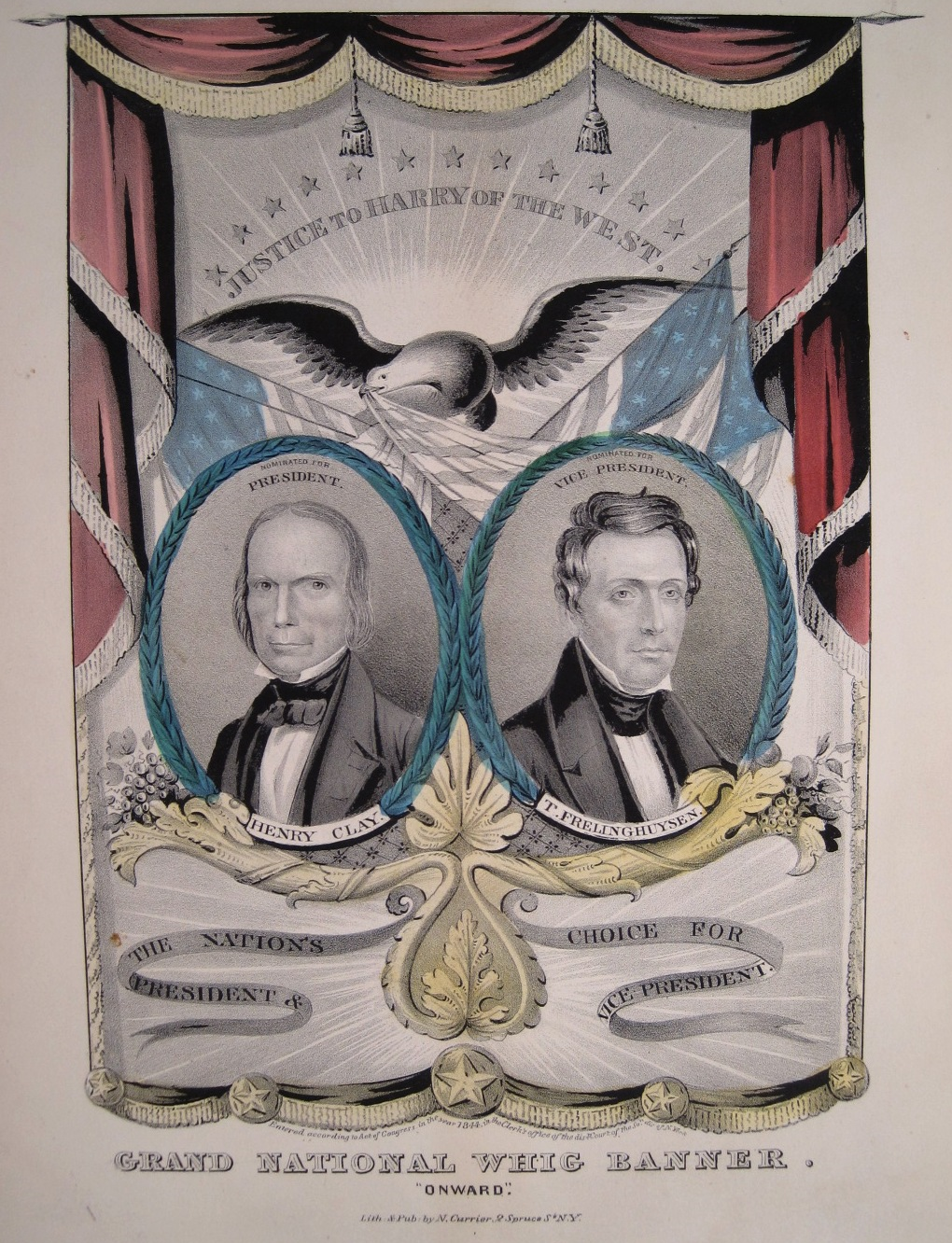
The 1844 Whig ticket, with Henry Clay and Theodore Frelinghuysen. It lacked the Tippecanoe ticket's success and catchy rhyme.

Harrison's 1840 campaign was one of firsts. It featured the first presidential candidate to speak for himself, the first to have a grassroots campaign involving the mass of the people (including many women, who could not then vote), and according to Shafer, "the beginning of presidential campaigning as entertainment". Gunderson noted, "for the first time, a presidential candidate abandoned a customary Olympic seclusion for the fervid clamor of the arena." In her biography of Harrison, Collins deemed the candidate's speechmaking as symbolic of "the erasing of the barrier between common Americans and their Chief Executive". Having been born in a log cabin, or in some other humble dwelling, remained a staple of presidential campaign biographies well into the 20th century.

Collins saw the 1840 campaign as "perhaps the last in which the parties focused on converting the newcomers rather than turning out the base and trying to tack on added support from the uncertain middle". Holt concurred that 1840 marked such a transition, "After 1840 political leaders could predict how most men would vote. The question was whether they voted at all." To ensure they did, politicians began to stress the conflict between the parties, trying to ensure voters would come to the polls even if they did not greatly care about the issues or candidates. The coalition that elected Harrison remained the foundation of the Whig Party until it dissolved amid sectional tensions over slavery in the 1850s.

Shafer saw Harrison's log cabin campaign as "the first image advertising campaign for a presidential candidate, establishing forever a basic tactic of political campaigns. It is called lying ... The rollicking run of Tippecanoe and Tyler Too changed presidential campaigns forever". K. R. Constantine Gutzman, who penned the American National Biography piece on Harrison, concurred: "The Whig campaign of 1840, in which Benjamin Harrison's son was portrayed as the occupant of a log cabin and a man of the people, is remembered derisively by historians (as it was derided by Democrats at the time) as the 'Log Cabin and Hard Cider' campaign. 'Tippecanoe and Tyler, Too' (the slogan that converted a controversial battle into a rousing victory in American popular memory) is supposed to have swayed a drunken electorate. In fact, as Henry Clay lamented, it was a Whig election cycle, and virtually anyone nominated as a Whig would probably have defeated Van Buren."

Gasaway disagreed that the Whigs deceived the voters, "The 'fable' of 1840 tells us that the Whigs triumphed over baffled and listless Democrats by convincing voters that Harrison lived in a log cabin and that he was a great war hero when, so the legend goes, neither claim was true. [But] Whigs did not say that Harrison lived in a log cabin and in fact went into great detail describing his actual house. The 'log cabin' was much more symbol than claim." Gasaway suggested that the 1840 campaign gained a poor reputation because Harrison and the Whig Party soon vanished from the scene, and many of those who had supported both in 1840 saw the election as a squandered opportunity: "Add to this the fact that the poor man died only thirty days into an administration launched by what was perhaps the most exciting election campaign in the nation's history up to that time and we are confronted ... with an undeniable and almost irresistible touch of opera bouffé."

Shafer saw the lasting legacy of Harrison's campaign:

The tactics pioneered by the Tippecanoe and Tyler Too campaign of 1840 live on to this day. Every four years, presidential candidates put up their tents and become ringmasters of a three-ring circus of hoopla, high-wire hijinks, and political promises. Perhaps the most positive effect of the 1840 campaign is that subsequent presidential candidates have had to appeal to grassroots Americans. Today's candidates go among the people to make speeches and, unlike Harrison, to spell out their positions. Women have become increasingly involved in presidential politics—as activists, voters, and candidates ... Give today's presidential candidates a choice between a new type of positive campaign ... or the traditional slash-and-burn attacks on their opponents, and, realistically, what is the likely response?
Keep the ball rolling. Huzzah. Huzzah.

== Popular and electoral vote ==
Electoral results
Presidential candidate	Party	Home state	Popular vote^{(a)}		Electoral vote	Running mate		
Presidential candidate	Party	Home state	Count	Percentage	Electoral vote	Vice-presidential candidate	Home state	Electoral vote
William Henry Harrison	Whig	Ohio	1,275,390	52.88%	234	John Tyler	Virginia	234
Martin Van Buren	Democratic	New York	1,128,854	46.81%	60	Richard Mentor Johnson	Kentucky	48
Martin Van Buren	Democratic	New York	1,128,854	46.81%	60	Littleton W. Tazewell	Virginia	11
Martin Van Buren	Democratic	New York	1,128,854	46.81%	60	James Knox Polk	Tennessee	1
James G. Birney	Liberty	New York	6,797	0.31%	0	Thomas Earle	Pennsylvania	0
Other			767	0.00%	—	Other		—
Total			2,411,808	100%	294			294
Needed to win					148			148

Source (Popular Vote): Leip, David. "1840 Presidential Election Results". Dave Leip's Atlas of U.S. Presidential Elections. Source (Electoral Vote): "Electoral College Box Scores 1789–1996". National Archives and Records Administration.

^{(a)} The popular vote figures exclude South Carolina where the electors were chosen by the state legislature rather than by popular vote.

Popular vote
Harrison	52.88%
Van Buren	46.81%
Others	0.31%

Electoral vote
Harrison	79.59%
Van Buren	20.41%

== Bibliography ==
- Boller, Paul F. Jr. (1984). Presidential Campaigns. New York: Oxford University Press. ISBN 978-0-19-503420-2.
- Collins, Gail (2012). William Henry Harrison. The American Presidents (Kindle ed.). New York: Times Books. ISBN 978-1-4299-7401-1. The numbers for Collins citations are Kindle locations.
- Gasaway, John G. (1999). Tippecanoe and the Party Press Too: Mass Communication, Politics, Culture, and the Fabled Presidential Election of 1840 (Thesis). Champaign/Urbana, Illinois: University of Illinois.
- Gunderson, Robert Gray (1957). The Log Cabin Campaign. Lexington, Kentucky: University of Kentucky Press. OCLC 964644.
- Holt, Michael T. (1999). The Rise and Fall of the American Whig Party. New York: Oxford University Press. ISBN 978-0-19-505544-3.
- Shafer, Robert (2016). Carnival Campaign: How the Rollicking 1840 Campaign of "Tippecanoe and Tyler Too" Changed Presidential Elections Forever (Kindle ed.). Chicago, Illinois: Chicago Review Press. ISBN 978-1-61373-540-4.
