= Old Settler's Song (Acres of Clams) =

Song by Pete Seeger

from the album Sing-a-long at Sanders Theatre, 1980
- Recorded: 1980
- Genre: Irish waltz
- Label: Smithsonian/Folkways
- Songwriter(s): Francis D. Henry

"Old Settler's Song (Acres of Clams)" (Roud 4746) is a Northwest United States folk song written by Francis D. Henry around 1874. The lyrics are sung to the tune "Old Rosin the Beau." The song also goes by the names "Acres of Clams", “Lay of the Old Settler,” “Old Settler’s Song,” "Puget Sound," while the melody is known as “Rosin the Beau,” "Old Rosin the Beau," "Rosin the Bow," "Mrs. Kenny," "A Hayseed Like Me," "My Lodging's on the Cold, Cold Ground." The Sacred Harp song "338 Sawyer's Exit" also uses the tune. The tune was also used for the song "Denver", which was recorded by The New Christy Minstrels in their 1962 live performance album The New Christy Minstrels - In Person.

The first recorded reference to this song was in the Olympia, Washington newspaper the Washington Standard in April 1877. Although no official record exists, "The Old Settler's Song" was thought to be the state song of Washington according to The People's Song Bulletin until it was decided the lyrics were not dignified enough.

The song achieved prominence decades later when radio-show singer Ivar Haglund used it as the theme song for his Seattle, Washington radio show. Pete Seeger and Woody Guthrie said that they taught the song to Haglund. Haglund went on to name the Seattle restaurant "Ivar's Acres of Clams" after the last line from the ballad.

Bing Crosby included the song in his album How the West Was Won (1959).

Pete Seeger sings additional verses written by Charlie King to protest the Seabrook Station Nuclear Power Plant in New Hampshire (1976). Both versions of the song are included on the live album Pete Seeger Singalong - Sanders Theatre, Cambridge, Massachusetts 1980.

== Lyrics ==
=== Version 1 ===
I've wandered all over this country,
Prospecting and digging for gold,
I've tunneled, hydraulicked and cradled,
And I nearly froze in the cold.

And I nearly froze in the cold,
And I nearly froze in the cold,
I've tunneled, hydraulicked and cradled,
And I nearly froze in the cold.

For one who got wealthy by mining,
I saw many hundreds get poor,
I made up my mind to go digging,
For something a little more sure,

For something a little more sure,
For something a little more sure.
I made up my mind to go digging,
For something a little more sure.

I rolled up my grub in my blanket,
I left all my tools on the ground,
I started one morning to shank it,
For the country they call Puget Sound,

For the country they call Puget Sound,
For the country they call Puget Sound.
I started one morning to shank it,
For the country they call Puget Sound.

No longer a slave of ambition,
I laugh at the world and its shams,
And I think of my happy condition,
Surrounded by Acres of Clams,

Surrounded by Acres of Clams,
Surrounded by Acres of Clams.
And I think of my happy condition,
Surrounded by Acres of Clams.

=== Version 2 ===
I've traveled all over this country
Prospecting and digging for gold
I've tunneled, hydraulicked and cradled
And I have been frequently sold.

For each man who got rich by mining
Perceiving that hundreds grew poor
I made up my mind to try farming
The only pursuit that was sure

So, rolling my grub in my blanket
I left all my tools on the ground
I started one morning to shank it
For the country they call Puget Sound.

Arriving flat broke in midwinter
I found it enveloped in fog
And covered all over with timber
Thick as hair on the back of a dog.

When I looked on the prospects so gloomy
The tears trickled over my face
And I thought that my travels had brought me
To the end of the jumping-off place.

I staked me a claim in the forest
And sat myself down to hard toil
For two years I chopped and I struggled
But I never got down to the soil.

I tried to get out of the country
But poverty forced me to stay
Until I became an old settler
Then nothing could drive me away.

And now that I'm used to the climate
I think that if a man ever found
A place to live easy and happy
That Eden is on Puget Sound.

No longer the slave of ambition
I laugh at the world and its shams
As I think of my pleasant condition
Surrounded by acres of clams.

=== "Lay of the Old Settler" version ===
I've traveled all over this country
Prospecting and digging for gold;
I've tunneled, hydraulicked and cradled,
And I have been frequently sold —

And I have been frequently so-o-old,
And I have been frequently sold:
I've tunneled, hydraulicked and cradled,
And I have been frequently sold!

For one who gained riches by mining,
Perceiving that hundreds grew poor,
I made up my mind to try farming,
The only pursuit that was sure —

The only pursuit that was su-u-ure,
The only pursuit that was sure,
I made up my mind to try farming,
The only pursuit that was sure!

So, rolling my grub in my blanket,
I left all my tools on the ground
And started one morning to shank it
For the country they call Puget Sound —

For the country they call Puget Sou-ou-ound,
For the country they call Puget Sound,
I started one morning to shank it
For the country they call Puget Sound.

Arriving flat broke in midwinter,
I found the land shrouded in fog
And covered all over with timber
Thick as hairs on the back of a dog —

Thick as hairs on the back of a do-o-og,
Thick as hairs on the back of a dog —
And covered all over with timber
Thick as hairs on the back of a dog!

When I looked on the prospects so gloomy,
The tears trickled over my face
And I thought that my travels had brought me
To the end of the jumping-off place!

To the end of the jumping-off pla-a-ace,
To the end of the jumping-off place:
I thought that my travels had brought me
To the end of the jumping-off place.

I staked me a claim in the forest,
And sat myself down to hard toil:
For six years I chopped and I labored,
But I never got down to the soil —

But I never got down to the soi-oi-oil,
I never got down to the soil:
For six years I chopped and I labored,
But I never got down to the soil!

I tried to get out of the country,
But poverty forced me to stay —
Until I became an old settler,
Then nothing could drive me away!

Then nothing could drive me away-ay-ay,
Then nothing could drive me away!
Until I became an old settler —
Then nothing could drive me away!

And now that I'm used to the climate,
I think that if a man ever found
A place to live easy and happy,
That Eden is on Puget Sound —

That Eden is on Puget Sou-ou-ound,
That Eden is on Puget Sound —
A place to live easy and happy?
That Eden is on Puget Sound!

No longer the slave of ambition,
I laugh at the world and its shams
As I think of my pleasant condition,
Surrounded by acres of clams —

Surrounded by acres of cla-a-ams,
Surrounded by acres of clams,
A poor boy will never go hungry,
Surrounded by acres of clams!

== See also ==
- The Old Settler (mountain)
