= Old Rosin the Beau =

Song
- Published: 1838
- Genre: Traditional folk

"Old Rosin the Beau" (or "Rosin the Bow") is a traditional folk song popular in America, England, Ireland, and Canada, first published in Philadelphia in 1838 though possibly dating back to the 1700s. It is listed in the Roud Folk Song Index as number 1192.

An earlier version, "Rosin the Bow" (not "Beau") refers to rosin with the bow of a violin, but both cover the same general subject (see below: Full lyrics). There are many variations of the song(s), and the tune has been re-used in other songs for political campaign jingles, slave songs, comedy songs, or other folk songs.

Early versions of "Old Rosin the Beau" relate the story of a man who was popular in his youth, then in late life, the ladies refer to him as "Old Rosin, the beau", as he prepares for the grave. As a drinking song, the chorus chimes, "Take a drink for Old Rosin the Beau" and uses dark comedy, with jests about his grave or tombstone, taken in stride while repeating the sing-song melody. As with many folk songs, the song is structured where soloists can sing a verse, and then the group can join the chorus/refrain portion after each verse.

Prominent recorded versions include versions by A.L. Lloyd, Lou Killen, The Clancy Brothers, and Gordon Bok.

== Partial lyrics ==
The lyrics depend on which version of the song is considered. The 1838 version of "Old Rosin the Beau" begins with the following verse: The lyrics, as arranged by J. C. Beckell in 1838, are as follows:

I have travell'd this wide world over,
And now to another I'll go.
I know that good quarters are waiting,
To welcome old Rosin the beau.

CHORUS
To welcome old Rosin the beau...
To welcome old Rosin the beau
I know that good quarters are waiting
To welcome old Rosin the beau.

The original folk song, "Rosin the Bow" begins as follows:

I've always been cheerful and easy,
And scarce have I needed a foe.
While some after money run crazy,
I merrily Rosin'd the Bow.

Some youngsters were panting for fashions,
Some new kick seemed now all the go,
But having no turbulent passions,
My motto was "Rosin the Bow."

== Early history ==
The melody commonly referred to in the United States as "Old Rosin the Bow" was originally written under the title of "Eoghan Coir" by Irish poet and songwriter Riocard Bairéad sometime in the late 18th Century. Following the Irish Rebellion of 1798, William Rooney adapted the melody into an Irish rebel song called "The Men of the West" for the centenary celebrations of the event.

== Other texts ==
Several US presidential campaign songs were set to the tune of "Old Rosin the Beau", including for Abraham Lincoln ("Lincoln and Liberty"). William Henry Harrison was the subject of three separate songs set to the tune: "The Hero of Tippecanoe", "Tyler and Tippecanoe", and another, similar, song by the same name. Henry Clay, Whig candidate in 1824, 1832, and 1844, was the subject of many more, in keeping with the Whig tradition of the time to glorify their candidates in song. George Hood's Henry Clay Minstrel, compiled in 1843, lists six: Harry, The Honest And True; The Ladies' Whig Song; The Whig Rifle Tune; The Saint Louis Clay Club Song; How Many Clay Men Are There, and Come All Ye Good Men Of The Nation.

A 19th-century American hymn by Seymour Boughton Sawyer, "How bright is the day when the Christian", was set to the tune and published as "Sawyer's Exit" in the Sacred Harp edition of 1850, in a three-part arrangement attributed to John Massengale.

The tune has been used in "Acres of Clams" (aka "Old Settler's Song"). It is also the melody to "Down in the Willow Garden" (aka "Rose Connolly"). Randy Sparks later used it for the song "Denver", performed by The New Christy Minstrels on their 1963 live album, The New Christy Minstrels – In Person.

The melody was also used in several Irish rebel songs including "The Boys of Kilmichael" " and "The Soldiers of Cumann na mBan".

On his album The Irish-American's Song, David Kincaid used the tune as the setting for a Confederate version of "Kelly's Irish Brigade", a song from the American Civil War, earlier set to "Columbia, Gem of the Ocean".

Other uses of this tune include two broadsides by Pete Seeger: "Acres of Clams", which dealt with the Seabrook Station Nuclear Power Plant, and "Bring Back Old 1899", which dealt with the dismantling of a federal water quality statute.

== Full lyrics ==
The full lyrics for one version of "Rosin the Bow" develop into dark comedy.

I've always been cheerful and easy,
And scarce have I needed a foe.
While some after money run crazy,
I merrily Rosin'd the Bow.

Some youngsters were panting for fashions,
Some new kick seemed now all the go,
But having no turbulent passions,
My motto was "Rosin the Bow."

So kindly my parents besought me,
No longer a roving to go,
And friends whom I thought had forgot me,
With gladness met Rosin the Bow.

My young day I spent all in roving,
But never was vicious, no, no;
But somehow I loved to keep moving,
And cheerfully Rosin'd the Bow.

In country or city, no matter,
Too often I never could go,
My presence all sadness would scatter,
So cheerful was Rosin the Bow.

The old people always grew merry,
Young faces with pleasure did glow,
While lips with the red of cherry,
Sipped "bliss to old Rosin the Bow."

While sweetly I played on my viol,
In measures so soft and so slow,
Old Time stopped the shade on the dial,
To listen to Rosin the Bow.

And peacefully now I am sinking,
From all this sweet world can bestow,
But Heaven's kind mercy I'm thinking,
Provides for old Rosin the Bow.

Now soon some still Sunday morning,
The first thing the neighbors will know,
Their ears will be met with the warning,
To bury old Rosin the Bow.

My friends will then so neatly dress me,
In linen as white as the snow,
And in my new coffin they'll press me,
And whisper "poor Rosin the Bow."

Then lone with my head on the pillow,
In peace I'll be sleeping below,
The grass and the breeze shaken willow,
That waves over Rosin the Bow.
