= Tippecanoe and Tyler Too =

Whig Party's Log Cabin Campaign song

- Front cover of the 1840 sheet music

Political campaign song
- Language: English
- Published: 1840
- Songwriter: Alexander Coffman Ross

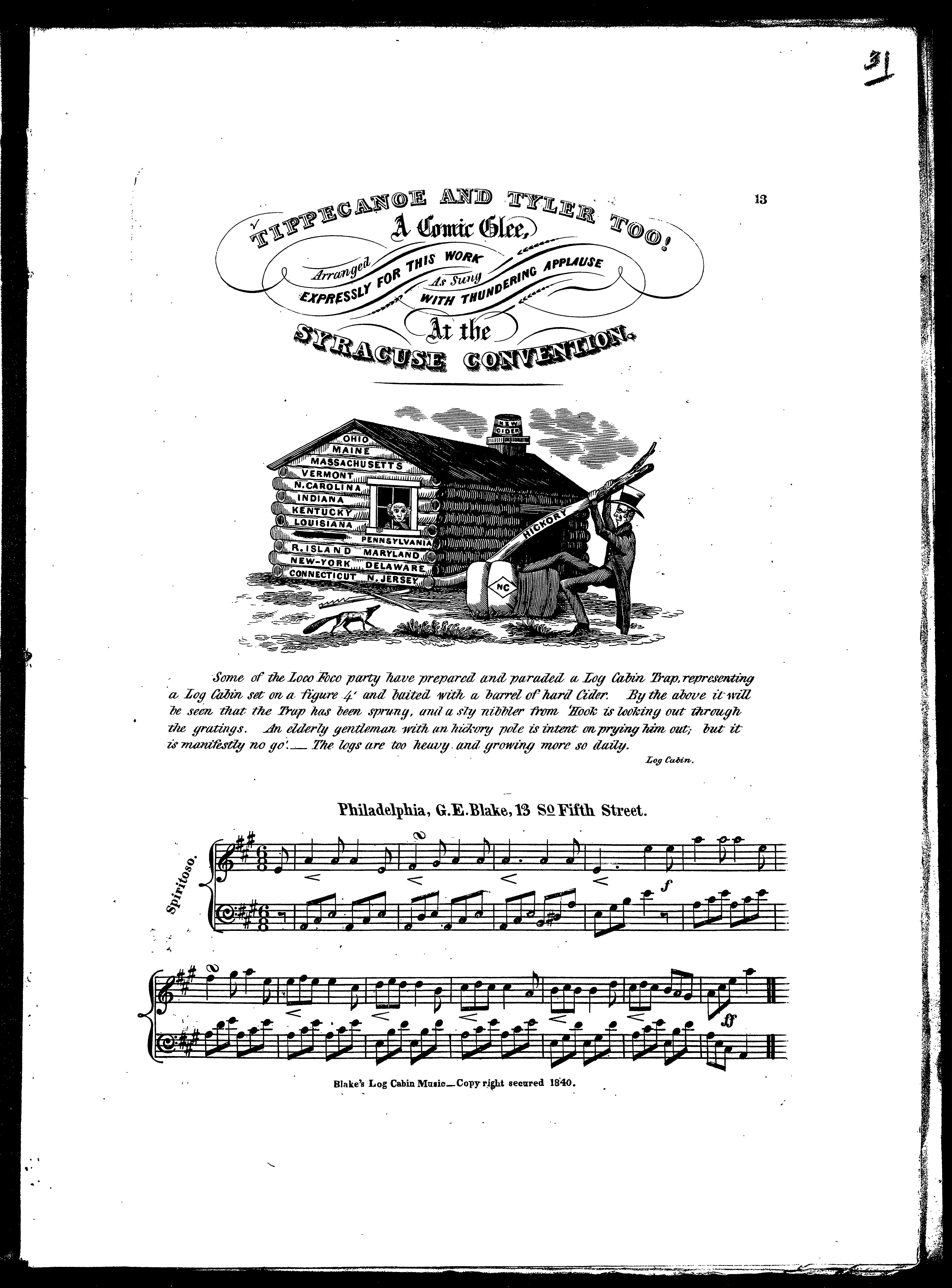
A score of the song as published by G. E. Blake of Philadelphia, Pennsylvania.

"Tippecanoe and Tyler Too", originally published as "Tip and Ty", is a campaign song of the Whig Party's Log Cabin Campaign in the 1840 United States presidential election. Its lyrics sang the praises of Whig candidate William Henry Harrison (the "hero of Tippecanoe") and John Tyler, while denigrating incumbent Democratic president Martin Van Buren ("Little Van").

Folk music critic Irwin Silber wrote that the song "firmly established the power of singing as a campaign device" in the United States, and that this and the other songs of 1840 represent a "Great Divide" in the development of American campaign music. The North American Review at the time even remarked that the song was, "in the political canvas of 1840 what the Marseillaise was to the French Revolution. It sang Harrison into the presidency."

== Origin ==
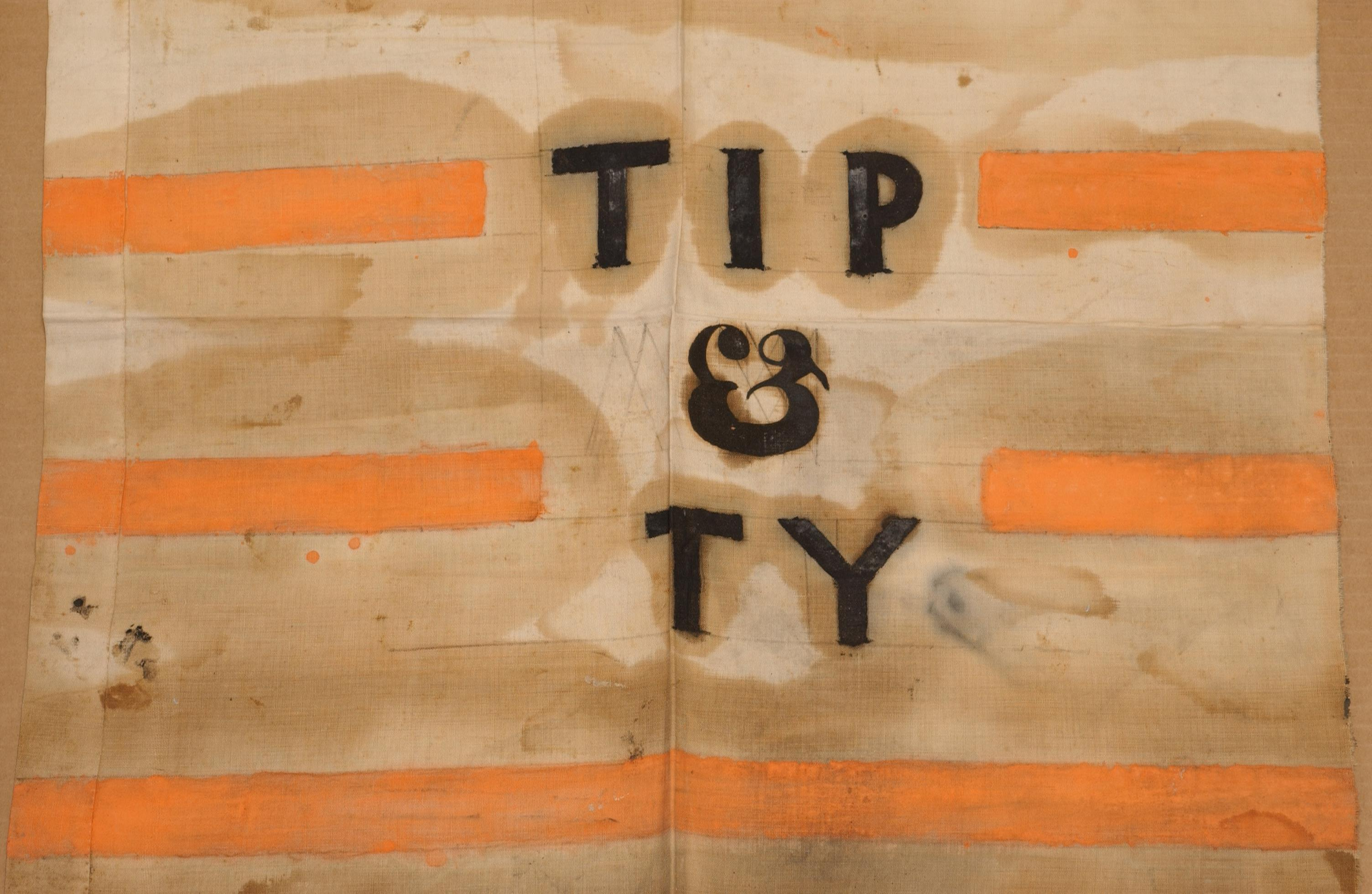
A campaign banner with the "Tip and Ty" slogan, derived from the song.

The song was written by Alexander Coffman Ross, a jeweler of Zanesville, Ohio, in 1840, to the music of the minstrelsy song "Little Pigs". He first performed it at a Whig meeting in Zanesville, and it came to national attention when, traveling on a business trip, he introduced it to a Whig rally in New York. Ross apparently never copyrighted the song.

"Little Pigs" is not well-documented, but the available evidence suggests that there was a substantial adaptation of the score for "Tip and Ty".

A historical society in Madison, Wisconsin, claimed that a local, the young nephew of future U.S. Supreme Court justice Levi Woodbury, wrote the first verses of the song and that its premiere performance at a Whig rally came at the suggestion of Woodbury. Woodbury was, however, by all accounts a Democrat, not a Whig, and was in fact serving as Secretary of the Treasury under Martin Van Buren at the time.

There were many variations on the song published at the time, especially ones with new verses. It has been called a "satirical, expandable text that permitted, nay urged, singers to add their own lines".

== Lyrics ==
Tip and Ty
What's the cause of this commotion, motion, motion,
Our country through?
It is the ball a-rolling on

For Tippecanoe and Tyler too.
For Tippecanoe and Tyler too.
And with them we'll beat little Van, Van, Van,
Van is a used up man.
And with them we'll beat little Van.

— First verse and chorus

Ross's version has twelve verses and a rousing chorus. There is repeated reference to rolling balls and constant motion, and rolling "great canvas balls" became a physical prop in the campaign pageantry, alongside the better-known log cabins and hard cider barrels.

The song's appeal has been compared to that of a great pop novelty song, as against the relative seriousness of most campaign songs.

Martin Van Buren is derided as "Little Van" and "Little Matty" and his supporters as "Vanjacks". These are contrasted with the rustic virtues of Harrison and the inevitability of his victory throughout the states.

The refrain For Tippecanoe and Tyler too is highly euphonious: It exhibits a triple alliteration, an internal rhyme, and nearly forms an iambic tetrameter.

== Modern recordings ==
Abbreviated version
First verse and chorus.

Full version
All twelve verses.

The song was part of the 1968 Off-Broadway musical How to Steal an Election and its cast album, with music and lyrics adapted by folk singer Oscar Brand.

The song has been recorded in a traditional form multiple times — in 1960 by Broadway veteran Howard Da Silva on the album "Politics and Poker — Songs to Get Elected By" released by Monitor Records (New York); in 1978 by Peter Janovsky on the album Winners and Losers: Campaign Songs from the Critical Elections in American History, Vol. 1 for Folkways Records; and in 1999 by Oscar Brand on the album Presidential Campaign Songs: 1789–1996 for Smithsonian Folkways Recordings, the successor label to Folkways Records.

The band They Might Be Giants recorded an alternative rock version of the song for the 2004 compilation album Future Soundtrack for America, using a three-verse lyric as adapted by Oscar Brand (from the first, eighth and second verses in Ross's original). The compilation was a benefit album for political causes relating to that year's election. John Flansburgh of They Might be Giants has remarked on the song's historical success as "the 'Rock Around the Clock' of campaign songs" and "the 'I Want to Hold Your Hand' of campaign songs."

The song is featured in Episode 3, Season 7 of the television series Parks and Recreation. Leslie Knope attempts to use the supposed remains of a cabin once belonging to Harrison to create groundswell support for converting the site into a national park.

== Legacy ==
When William Henry Harrison's grandson, Benjamin Harrison ran for President in 1888 the nickname Tippecanoe was carried forward and featured in the campaign.

Benjamin Harrison-Morton "The Ball is A'Rolling" Ribbon, 1888 (4360081044)
