= Anacreon (disambiguation) =

Anacreon was a poet from Ancient Greece.

Anacreon may also refer to:

== Persons ==
- Carl Michael Bellman, sometimes referred to as the Anacreon of Sweden
- Hafez, sometimes referred to as the Anacreon of Persia
- Francesco Albani, sometimes referred to as the Anacreon of Painters
- Bertrand Barère, sometimes referred to as Anacreon of the Guillotine

== In media ==
- Anacréon, the title of two different operatic works written by Jean-Philippe Rameau:
  - Anacréon (Rameau, 1754)
  - Anacréon, an act added to Rameau's opéra-ballet Les surprises de l'Amour in 1757
- Anacréon (Cherubini), the title of an 1803 opera by Luigi Cherubini
- "To Anacreon in Heaven", the official song of the Anacreontic Society and the melody of the U.S. national anthem, The Star-Spangled Banner
- Anacreon: Reconstruction 4021, a 1988 MS-DOS computer game with a 2004 update
- Anacreon (fictional planet), a fictional planet in Isaac Asimov's Robot, Empire and Foundation series of science fiction novels

== See also ==
- Anacreontic Society
- HMS Anacreon
