= John Stafford Smith =

British composer (1750–1836)

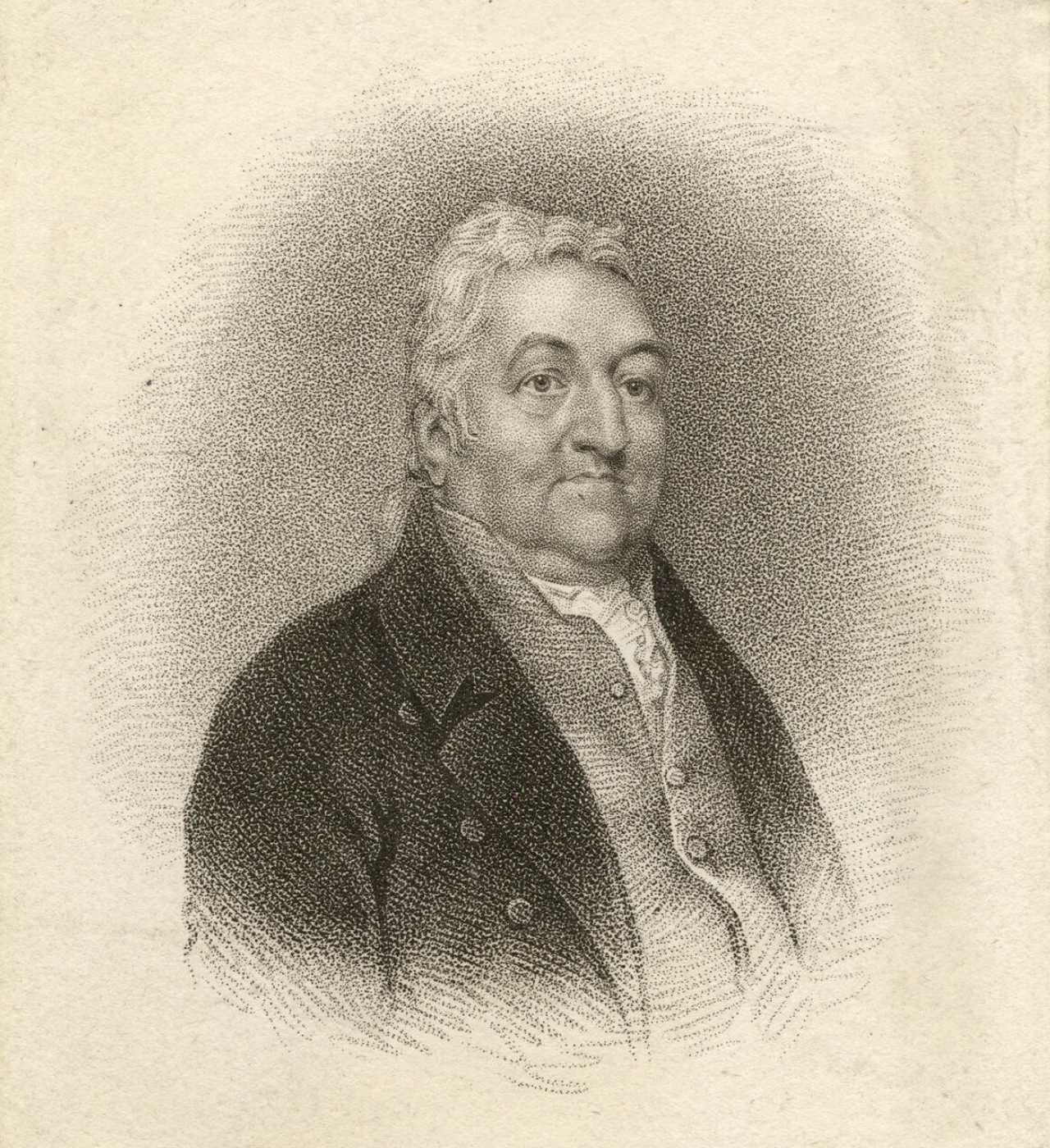
- Portrait of Smith after William Behnes, 1822
- Born: Gloucester, England
- Baptized: 30 March 1750
- Died: 21 September 1836 (aged 86); London, England
- Occupations: Composer; church organist; musicologist
- Known for: Composing "The Anacreontic Song", which was later adopted as the tune of the Star-Spangled Banner, the national anthem of the United States

John Stafford Smith (bapt. 30 March 1750 – 21 September 1836) was an English composer, church organist, and early musicologist. He was one of the first serious collectors of manuscripts of works by Johann Sebastian Bach and a friend of his son Johann Christian Bach.

Smith is best known for writing the music for "The Anacreontic Song", which became the tune for the American patriotic song "The Star-Spangled Banner" following the War of 1812, and in 1931 was adopted as the national anthem of the United States.

== Early life and education ==
John Stafford Smith was born in Pitt Street, Gloucester on March 13, 1750 and was baptised in Gloucester Cathedral, England, on 30 March 1750, the son of Martin Smith, organist of Gloucester Cathedral from 1743 to 1782. He attended the Gloucester cathedral school, where he became a boy-singer. He furthered his career as a choir boy at the Chapel Royal, London, and also studied under Dr William Boyce. He married Elizabeth Boyce, the daughter of Dr William Boyce, at St Philip & St Jacob Church, Bristol, on 25 November 1775.

== Career ==
By the 1770s he had gained a reputation as a composer and an organist. He was elected as a member of the select Anacreontic Society which boasted amongst its membership Samuel Johnson, James Boswell and Sir Joshua Reynolds.

In the 1770s, Smith composed music for the society's constitutional song entitled "To Anacreon in Heaven" (The Anacreontic Song). The words were by Ralph Tomlinson, the president of the society, and were inspired by the 6th-century BC Greek lyric poet, Anacreon, who wrote odes on the pleasures of love and wine. The song became popular in Britain and also America following the establishment of several Anacreontic Societies there.

Smith later became a Gentleman of the Chapel Royal in 1784, organist for the Chapel Royal in 1802 and Master of the Children in 1805. He also became lay-vicar of Westminster Abbey. He was organist at the Three Choirs Festival held at Gloucester in 1790. He met and worked with Joseph Haydn during the famous composer's London visit.

Smith is considered to be the first Englishman to be a serious antiquarian and musicologist. He began by publishing A Collection of English Song in 1779, which musicologist Nicholas Temperley called "perhaps the first scholarly edition printed in England." Smith's library included the Old Hall Manuscript, Drexel 4175, as well as a copy of Ulm Gesangbuch from 1538 that had belonged to Johann Sebastian Bach. He also collected works that dated back to the 12th century including some Gregorian chants. His publication Musica Antiqua (1812) included musical scores of works by Jacob Obrecht, Adrian Willaert, Jacob Clemens and Cristóbal de Morales with historical notes on each piece. According to Vincent Duckles, Smith's major contribution was "to direct the attention of his readers to the importance of source studies."

== Death ==
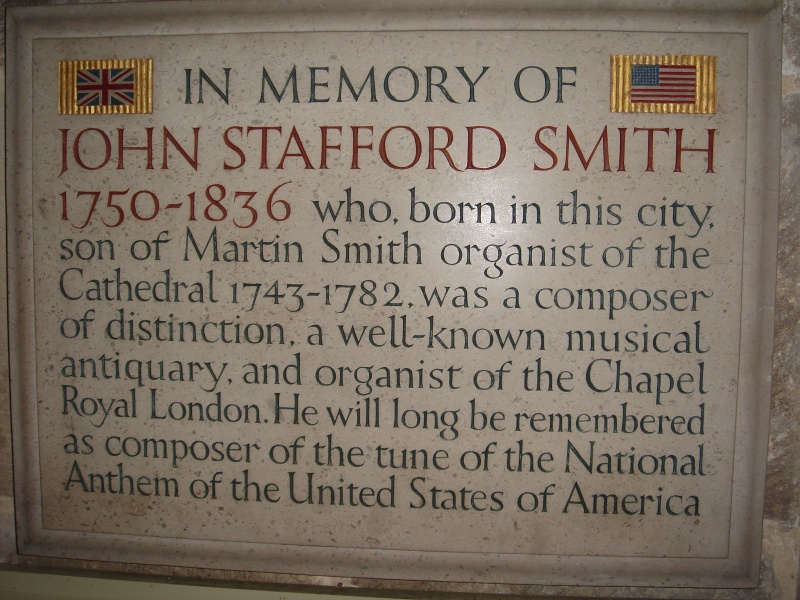
John Stafford Smith's memorial in Gloucester Cathedral

Smith died in 1836 at the age of eighty-six. He was buried at St Luke's Church, Chelsea, and has a memorial plaque in Gloucester Cathedral, above which are displayed the US and UK's flags.

It is often said that Smith's death was caused by a grape-pip lodged in his windpipe. According to Pliny the Elder the ancient Greek lyric poet Anacreon, after whom the Anacreontic Society is named (and hence Smith's most famous piece), died when he was choked by a grape-stone.

== Legacy ==
=== National anthem of the United States ===
In 1814, Francis Scott Key wrote the poem "Defence of Fort M'Henry" (later re-titled, "The Star-Spangled Banner"), setting it to the tune of "To Anacreon in Heaven", a piece composed by Smith. The US Congress officially designated this song as the US national anthem in 1931.

Cultural offices
| Preceded by Samuel Arnold | First Organist of the Chapel Royal; 1802–1836 | Succeeded by Thomas Attwood |
| Preceded by Edmund Ayrton | Master of the Children of the Chapel Royal; 1805–1817 | Succeeded by William Hawes |
