= Adams and Liberty =

Campaign song of John Adams

tune of The Anacreontic Song, also used as the tune for Adams and Liberty

"Adams and Liberty" is considered the first significant campaign song in American political history, and served to support incumbent Federalist John Adams in the 1800 United States presidential election.

The lyrics are from Robert Treat Paine Jr., to the tune of "The Anacreontic Song" (the same tune as the patriotic song and future national anthem "The Star-Spangled Banner".)

The country is poetically referred to as Columbia, and enduring national greatness depends on avoiding the evils of mercantilism, French alliances (see XYZ Affair), and Political faction. Other songs were used in subsequent presidential campaigns.

== Sources ==
- Silber, Irwin (1971). Songs America Voted By. Harrisburg, Pennsylvania: Stackpole Books.
