= Julianus the Egyptian =

Greek Byzantine administrator and epigrammatist

Julianus, or Julian, surnamed the Egyptian (Greek: Ἰουλιανός ὁ Αἰγύπτιος, Ioulianos; Latin: Julianus Aegyptius; fl. 6th century AD) was a Greek Byzantine administrator and epigrammatist.

== Life ==
Described in the lemmata of his epigrams as apo hypaton and apo hyparchon ("ex-prefect"), it is inferred that Julianus served as Prefect of Egypt at some point during the reign of Justinian, and is likely to be the Julianus who was Praetorian Prefect of the East in 530/531, who supported the short-lived usurper Hypatius.

== Works ==
Seventy-one epigrams are ascribed to Julianus in the Greek Anthology. They are primarily of a sensual and descriptive character derivative of earlier poems of the same kind. There are also two epigrams addressed to Hypatius, the nephew of the emperor Anastasius, who was put to death in AD 532 for inciting a failed rebellion against Justinian (7.591 and 7.592). Another epigram concerns Joannes, the nephew or grandson of Hypatius (7.590). One of Julianus' epigrams from the Greek Anthology (16.388) was included in the Anacreontea, attributed to Anacreon.

== Translations ==
| Epigram | Title | Translator | Publication |
|---|---|---|---|
| 16.388 | In Imitation of Anacreon | George Ogle | The Loves of Hero and Leander, 1728 |
| 16.388 | On Cupid | Joseph Addison | The Works of Anacreon, 1735 |
| 6.18 | "Lais, when Time had spoil'd her wonted Grace," | George Ogle | Antiquities Explained, 1737 |
| 7.32 | "What oft alive I sung, now dead I cry" | Francis Fawkes | The Works of Anacreon, Sappho, Bion, Moschus and Musæus, 1760 |
| 16.388 | The Love-Draught | Francis Fawkes | The Works of Anacreon, Sappho, Bion, Moschus and Musæus, 1760 |
| 16.388 | Ode VI | Thomas Moore | Odes of Anacreon, 1800 |
| 7.32 | "This lesson oft in life I sung," | Thomas Moore | Odes of Anacreon, 1800 |
| 9.447 | From the Greek of Julianus | William Cowper | The Life and Posthumous Writings of William Cowper, 1803 |
| 7.565 | Another | William Cowper | The Life and Posthumous Writings of William Cowper, 1803 |
| 16.388 | An Anacreontic | John Herman Merivale | The Athenæum, January 1809 |
| 7.59 | On Democritus | John Herman Merivale | Collections from the Greek Anthology, 1813 |
| 6.12 | The Offering of Three Brother Sportsmen | John Herman Merivale | Collections from the Greek Anthology, 1813 |
| 16.388 | "While for my fair a wreath I twined," | Charles James Blomfield | Museum Criticum, 1814 |
| 7.600 | "Thine, Laura—thou, of every grace the bloom!" | Francis Wrangham | Psychæ; or, Songs on Butterflies, 1828 |
| 16.388 | From the Greek of Julianus | John Doran | The Royal Lady's Magazine, June 1831 |
| 7.599 | "She that was called the Beautiful—(so named)" | William Mcleager Hay | Blackwood's Edinburgh Magazine, April 1835 |
| 16.130 | On a Statue of Niobe | William Mcleager Hay | Blackwood's, November 1835 |
| 16.388 | Cupid Swallowed! A Paraphrase | Leigh Hunt | The New Monthly Magazine and Literary Journal, September 1836 |
| 7.590 | Epitaph | William Mcleager Hay | Blackwood's, May 1837 |
| 5.298 | To Mary | William Mcleager Hay | Blackwood's, May 1837 |
| 16.113 | "'Tis Philoctetes' self! To all how well" | Goldwin Smith | Anthologia Polyglotta, 1849 |
| 7.603 | "Cruel is Death? Nay kind. He that is ta'en" | Goldwin Smith | Anthologia Polyglotta, 1849 |
| 7.599 | "More for her gracious spirit than her face" | John Burgon | Anthologia Polyglotta, 1849 |
| 16.388 | An Ode in the Manner of Anacreon | Samuel Taylor Coleridge | The Poetical Works of Samuel Taylor Coleridge, 1893 |
| 7.600 | The Bride of Sixteen | F. L. Lucas | A Greek Garland: A Selection from the Palatine Anthology, 1939 |

== Sources ==
- Cameron, Alan. "Some Prefects Called Julian". Byzantion, vol. 47, 1977, pp. 42–64. JSTOR. Accessed 21 Aug. 2021.
- Paton, W. R., ed. (1916). The Greek Anthology I, II, III, IV, V (Loeb Classical Library). London: Heinemann, 1916.
- Smith, William, ed. (1870). "Julianus. 2.". Dictionary of Greek and Roman Biography and Mythology. Vol. II. London. p. 643.
