= Ralph Tomlinson =

British lyricist

- Born: 17 August 1744; Cheshire, England
- Died: 17 March 1778 (aged 33)
- Occupation: Lyricist
- Known for: Wrote the original lyrics to "The Anacreontic Song", whose melody was later adopted as the tune of the national anthem of the United States.

Ralph Tomlinson (17 August 1744 – 17 March 1778), was a British lyricist best known for writing the original lyrics to "The Anacreontic Song". The music from the Anacreontic Song would be set as the music for "The Star Spangled Banner", which would become the American national anthem in 1931. In 1776, he became the President of the Anacreontic Society, after the death of the previous President, George Bellas.

== Biography ==
Tomlinson was baptized in Plemstall, Cheshire, in 1744; by 1766 he was a lawyer working in London. Tomlinson likely became president of the Anacreontic Society following the death of the previous president, George Bellas, in January 1776. Tomlinson died in March 1778 at the age of thirty-three.

== The Anacreontic Song ==
The Anacreontic Song was written for a social club named the Anacreontic Society, which was named in honour of the Ancient Greek poet Anacreon. John Stafford Smith wrote the music and Tomlinson, who was president of the club, wrote the lyrics. The song, which had become a very popular tune in Colonial America, was used to put music to Francis Scott Key's poem, Defence of Fort M’Henry, turning it into The Star-Spangled Banner. Long before songs were protected by copyright, the melodies of songs were used by anyone without compensation. The lyrics are "a good-natured takeoff on a bit of pseudoclassical mythology". The Star-Spangled Banner became the United States National anthem on March 3, 1931.

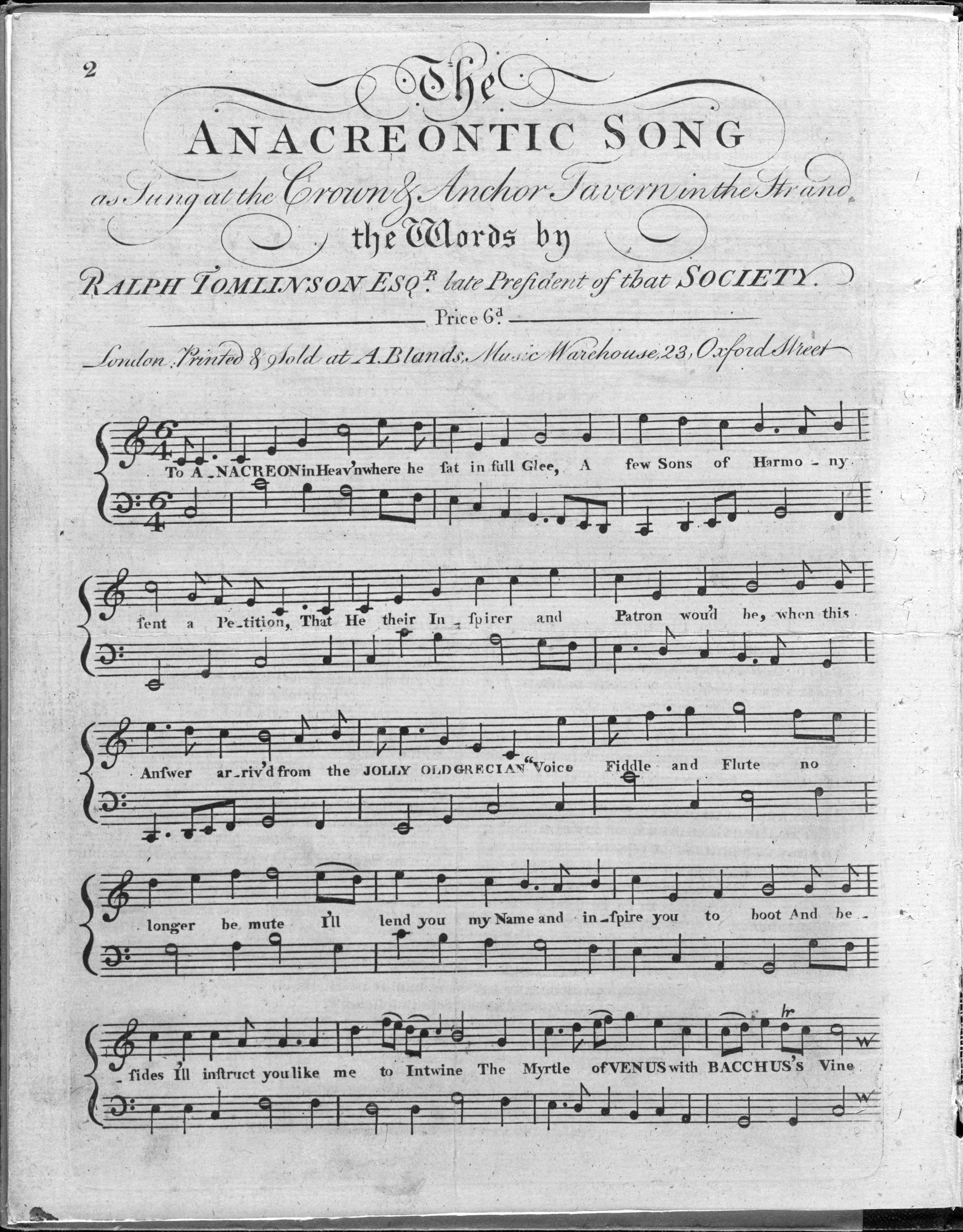
The original score of The Anacreontic Song, which Tomlinson wrote the lyrics to.

== Writings ==
Tomlinson was the author of A Slang Pastoral, a parody of John Byrom's poem that begins "My Time, O ye Muses, was happily spent," that was originally published in The Spectator.

== Bibliography ==
- Lichtenwanger, William (1977). The Music of "The Star-Spangled Banner": From Ludgate Hill to Capitol Hill. Washington DC: Government Printing Office. ISBN 0-8444-0253-2. PDF link.
- Lichtenwanger, William (1978). "The Music of "The Star-Spangled Banner": Whence and Whither?". College Music Symposium. 18 (2). College Music Society: 34–81.

=== Further reading ===
- American Catholic Historical Society (June 2013). Records of the American Catholic Historical Society of Philadelphia. Vol. 25. HardPress Publishing. ISBN 978-1314395587.
- Tomlinson, Ralph (1780). A Slang Pastoral: being a parody on a celebrated poem of Dr. Byron's.
