= HMS Anacreon =

Four vessels of Britain's Royal Navy have borne the name HMS Anacreon, named after the Greek poet Anacreon.

- HMS Anacreon (1799) was the French privateer Anacreon, which HMS Champion captured in 1799. She was sold in 1802.
- HMS Anacreon was the mercantile Anacreon launched at Sunderland in 1800 that the Navy acquired in 1804 for use as a defense ship of 16 guns. The Navy returned her to her owners in 1805, and she was wrecked in 1823.
- HMS Anacreon (1813) was a Cormorant-class ship-sloop launched in 1813 and lost, presumed foundered with all hands, in February 1814 while en route from Lisbon.
- HMS Anacreon (1815) was a schooner launched in 1815 and transferred to Customs the following year.
