= Anacreontea =

Collection of Greek poems

Anacreontea (Ancient Greek: Ἀνακρεόντεια) is the title given to a collection of some sixty Greek poems on the topics of wine, beauty, erotic love, and the worship of Dionysus. The poems themselves appear to have been composed over a long period of time, dating to between the 1st century BC and the 6th century AD, and is attributed pseudepigraphically to Anacreon.

The collection of poems by numerous, anonymous imitators was long believed to be the works of Anacreon himself. It was preserved in a 10th-century manuscript which also included the Palatine Anthology. The poems were published in 1554 with a Latin translation by Henri Estienne, known as Stephanus, but little is known about the origins of the manuscript. Salmasius reports seeing the Anacreontea in the Palatine Library in Heidelberg in 1607. In 1623, it was given to Pope Gregory XV after the sacking of Heidelberg. It was later taken from the Vatican City by Napoleon in 1797, who had it rebound as two separate volumes. One of those volumes was returned to Heidelberg but the other remained in the Bibliothèque Nationale in Paris.

In the 17th century, Thomas Stanley translated the Anacreontea into English verse. A few poems were also translated by Robert Herrick and Abraham Cowley. One of the poems is attributed to Julianus the Egyptian in the Greek Anthology. They reflect the light hearted elegance of much of Anacreon's genuine works although they were not written in the same Ionic Greek dialect that Anacreon used. They also display literary references and styles more common to the actual time of their composition.

== See also ==
- Anacreontics
- Anacreontic Society
