= Robert Treat Paine Jr. =

American poet

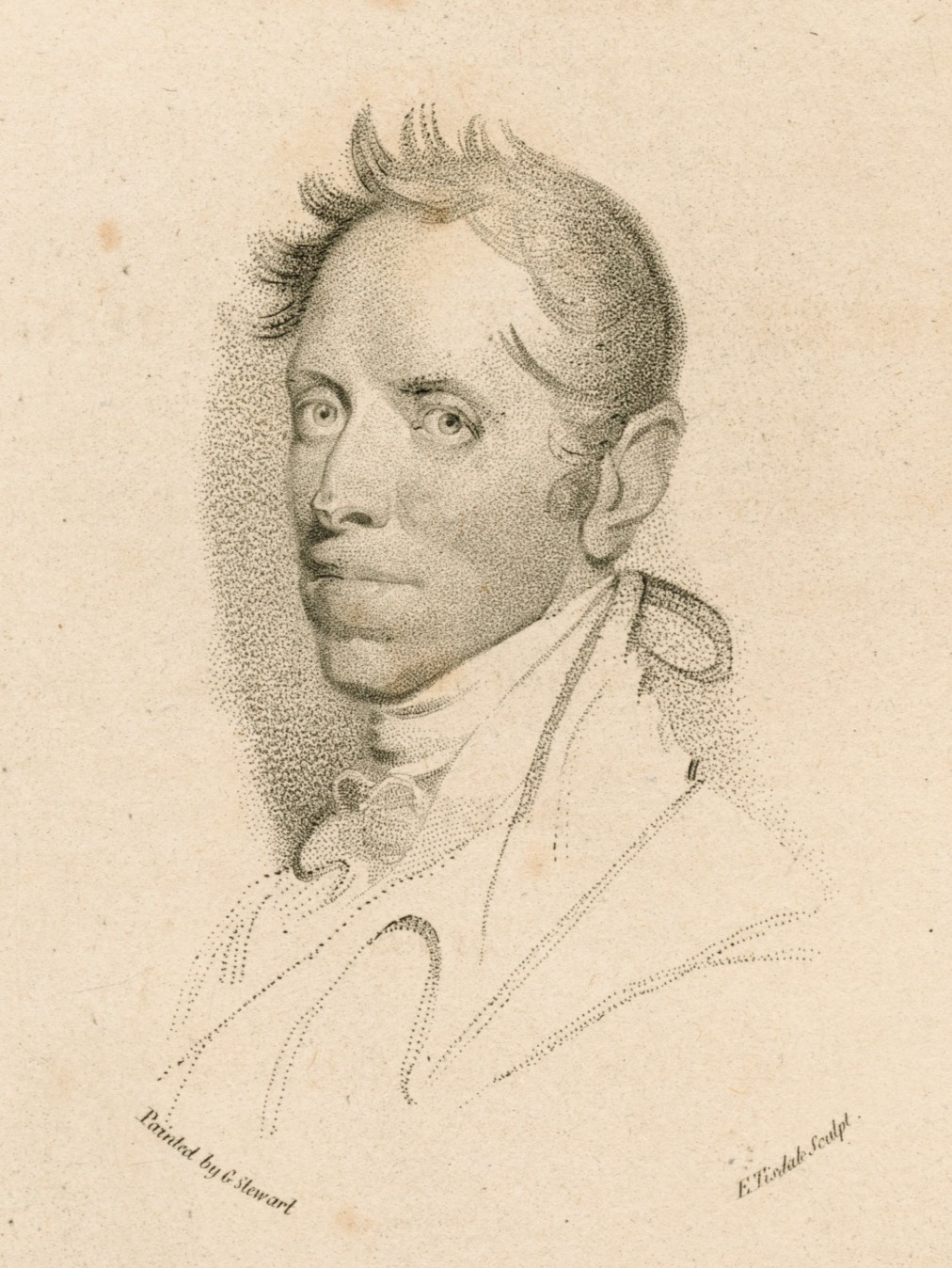
- Robert Treat Paine Jr.
- Born: Thomas Paine; December 9, 1773
- Died: November 13, 1811 (aged 37)
- Occupations: Poet, editor
- Known for: "Adams and Liberty"
- Father: Robert Treat Paine

Robert Treat Paine Jr. (December 9, 1773 – November 13, 1811) was an American poet and editor. He was the second son of Robert Treat Paine, signer of the Declaration of Independence. Born Thomas Paine (after his paternal grandfather), he changed his name to that of his recently deceased older brother in 1801, in part as a tribute to his father and in part to avoid confusion with the more famous Thomas Paine, the revolutionary pamphleteer, who was unpopular at that time. He received bachelor's and master's degrees from Harvard University, for whose commencement ceremonies he wrote a number of pieces.

== Works ==
Among his works are:

- "The Invention of Letters" commencement verse delivered at Harvard University; described the history of thought, eulogized George Washington and attacked Jacobins (1795).
- The Ruling Passion (1796), the "longest and most perfect of all his poetical productions", according to his biographer Charles Prentiss.
- "Adams and Liberty", the author's most famous work, sung throughout the country, praising America's independence from European tyranny (1798). The lyrics were designed to be sung to the tune of "To Anacreon in Heaven" (which tune was later used for "The Star-Spangled Banner", the American national anthem).
- Communication on the Boston Female Asylum. Boston Gazette, April 1, 1802. (Reprinted in 1812 in The Works, in Verse and Prose..., p. 344 et seq.)
- The Works, in Verse and Prose, of the Late Robert Treat Paine, Jun. Esq. With Notes. To which are prefixed, sketches of his life, character and writings, Boston: printed and published by J. Belcher; posthumously published (1812), with poems in such genres as political satire, drama criticism, neoclassical verse and spiritual prose, all selected by Charles Prentiss; contains "Philenia to Menander" by Sarah Wentworth Apthorp Morton.
