= Anacreontic Society =

18th century gentlemen's club in London, England

Coordinates: 51°30′44.79″N 0°6′50.78″W

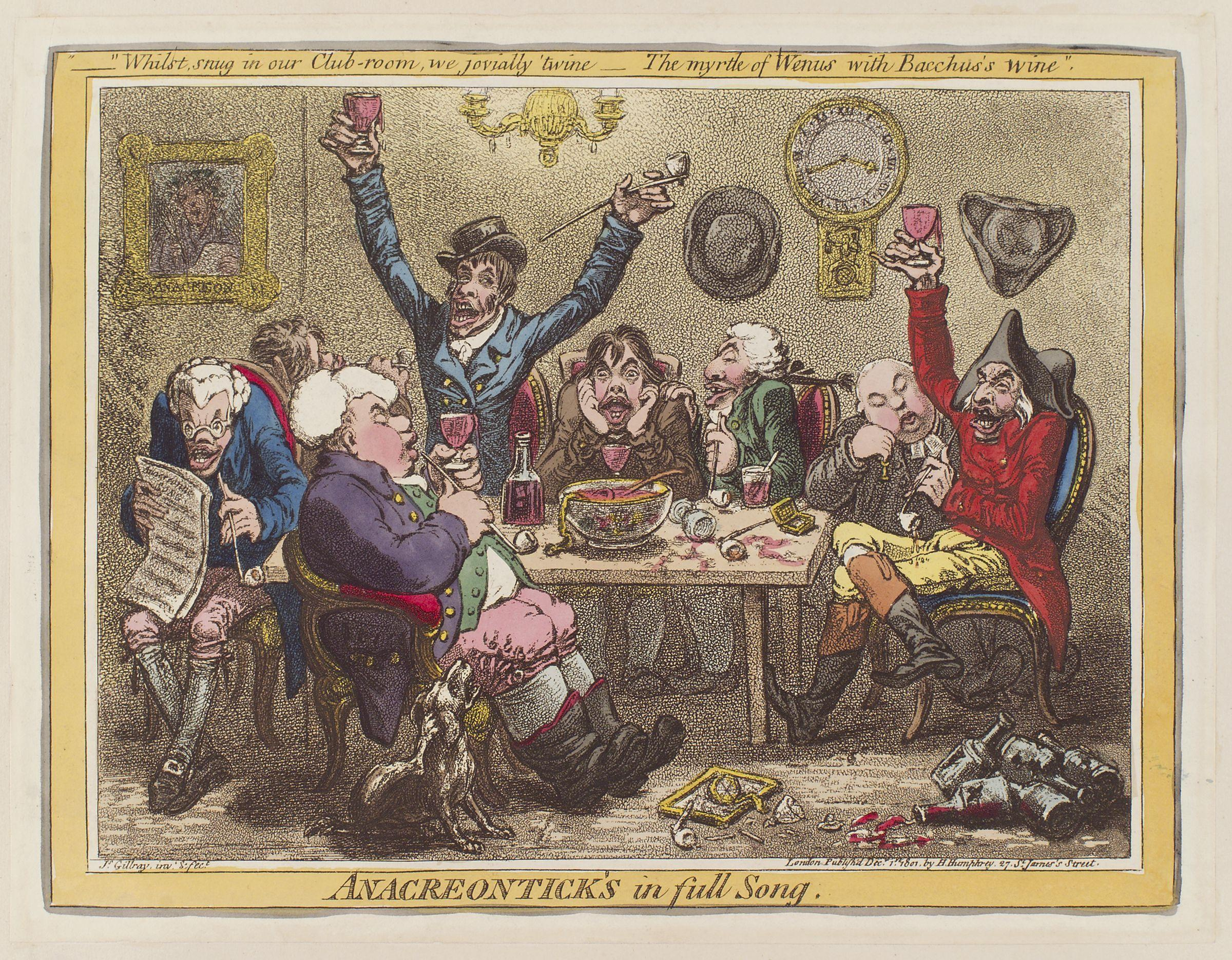
James Gillray's "Anacreontick's in full Song", 1801

The Anacreontic Society was a popular gentlemen's club of amateur musicians in London founded in the mid-18th century. These barristers, doctors, and other professional men named their club after the Greek court poet Anacreon, who lived in the 6th century B.C. and whose poems, "anacreontics", were used to entertain patrons in Teos and Athens. Dubbed "the convivial bard of Greece", Anacreon's songs often celebrated women, wine, and entertaining.

While the society's membership, one observer noted, was dedicated to "wit, harmony, and the god of wine", their primary goal (beyond companionship and talk) was to promote an interest in music. The society presented regular concerts of music, and included among their guests such important musicians as Joseph Haydn, who was the special guest at their concert in January 1791.

There is also evidence of an Anacreontic Society having existed at St Andrews University in the late 18th century in much the same vein as the Anacreontic Society of London. However, due to the club's informal nature, detailed accounts of the group are sparse. The collection of the Irish Anacreontic Society, active in Dublin from 1740 to 1865, is among the special collections of the Royal Irish Academy of Music.

== History ==
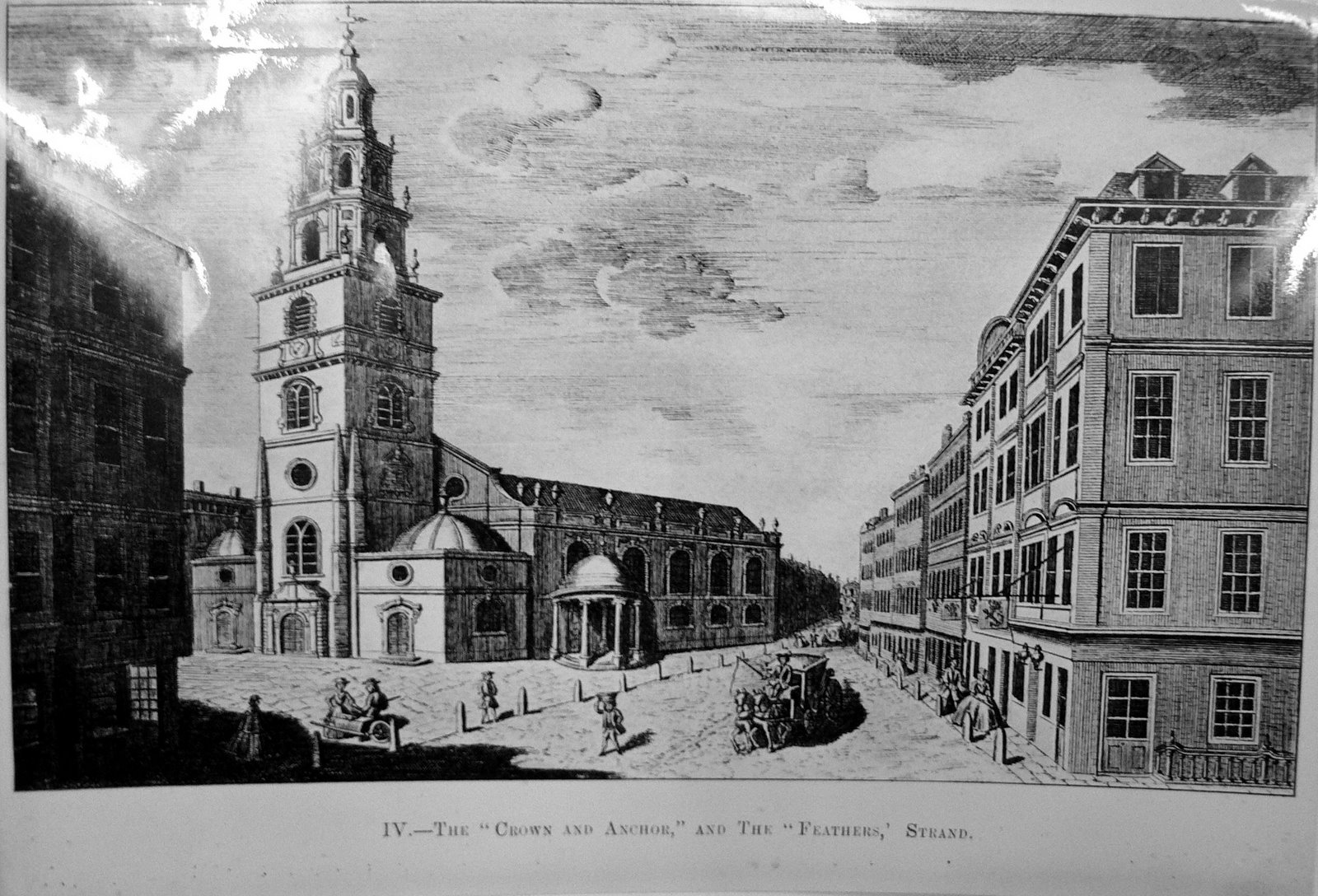
The Crown and Anchor tavern, where the Society met from the late 1770s, is visible on the right. The Church on the left is St Clement Danes.

According to an anonymous "History of the Anacreontic Society" published in 1780, the Society was founded "about the year 1766" by one Jack Smith. The Society initially met in various taverns, and then moved to the London Coffee House on Ludgate Hill. It subsequently relocated to the Crown and Anchor tavern in The Strand in order to accommodate an expansion in its membership from 25 to 40. Its membership later increased to 80.

A musical high-point of the society occurred in January 1791, when Haydn attended a meeting at which the twelve-year-old Johann Hummel performed, "astonish[ing] the company with a most admirable performance of a favourite English ballet, with variations, on the harpsichord".

The Society came to an end after the Duchess of Devonshire attended one of its meetings. Because "some of the comic songs [were not] exactly calculated for the entertainment of ladies, the singers were restrained; which displeasing many of the members, they resigned one after another; and a general meeting being called, the society was dissolved." It is not clear exactly when this incident occurred, but in October 1792 it was reported that "The Anacreontick Society meets no more; it has long been struggling with symptoms of internal decay".

== Meetings ==
The Society met twelve times a year, starting in late November, and continuing every other Wednesday evening. Each meeting began at half past seven with a lengthy concert, featuring "the best performers in London", who were made honorary members of the Society. Following the concert, the members adjourned to another room for a meal, after which the members would participate in "catches and glees", "songs", "miniature puppet-shews", and "everything that mirth can suggest". The members, who paid a subscription fee of three guineas, were generally of "fashionable society" including "several noblemen and gentlemen of the first distinction". Each member was entitled to admit one guest.

== "To Anacreon in Heaven" ==
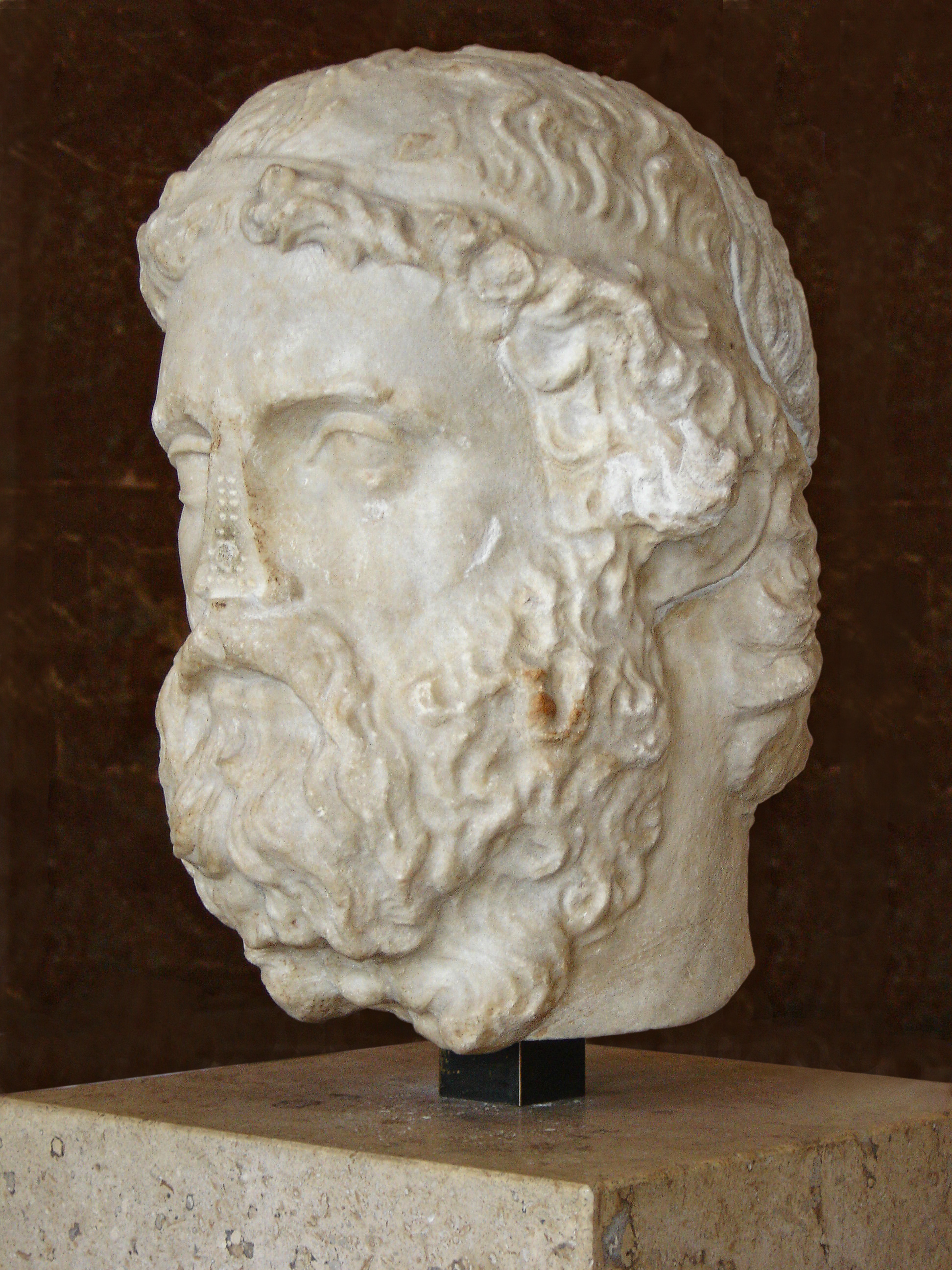
A bust of Anacreon

The lyrics of the Anacreontic Song, or "To Anacreon in Heaven", were written by Ralph Tomlinson, who had been president of the society. John Stafford Smith wrote the tune. The lyrics were first published by London's The Vocal magazine in 1778.

The Anacreontic Song served as the "constitutional song" of the Society. After the initial concert and meal, the Song would be sung in order to open the after-supper, more light-hearted part of proceedings. The verses, which are difficult to sing because of their wide range, would be sung by a solo singer, with the entire Society joining in the refrain.

It soon became a popular drinking song on both sides of the Atlantic. The melody, if not the original lyrics, would acquire even greater fame after the attorney Francis Scott Key wrote "Defence of Fort M'Henry" while detained on a British ship during the night of September 13, 1814, as the British forces bombarded the American Fort McHenry during the War of 1812. The song combining Key's text with Smith's tune is today known as "The Star-Spangled Banner", the national anthem of the United States of America.

== See also ==
- Anacreontics
- Anacreontea
- "To Anacreon in Heaven"
