= Anacreon =

Greek lyric poet (c. 573 – c. 495 BC)

- Ἀνακρέων
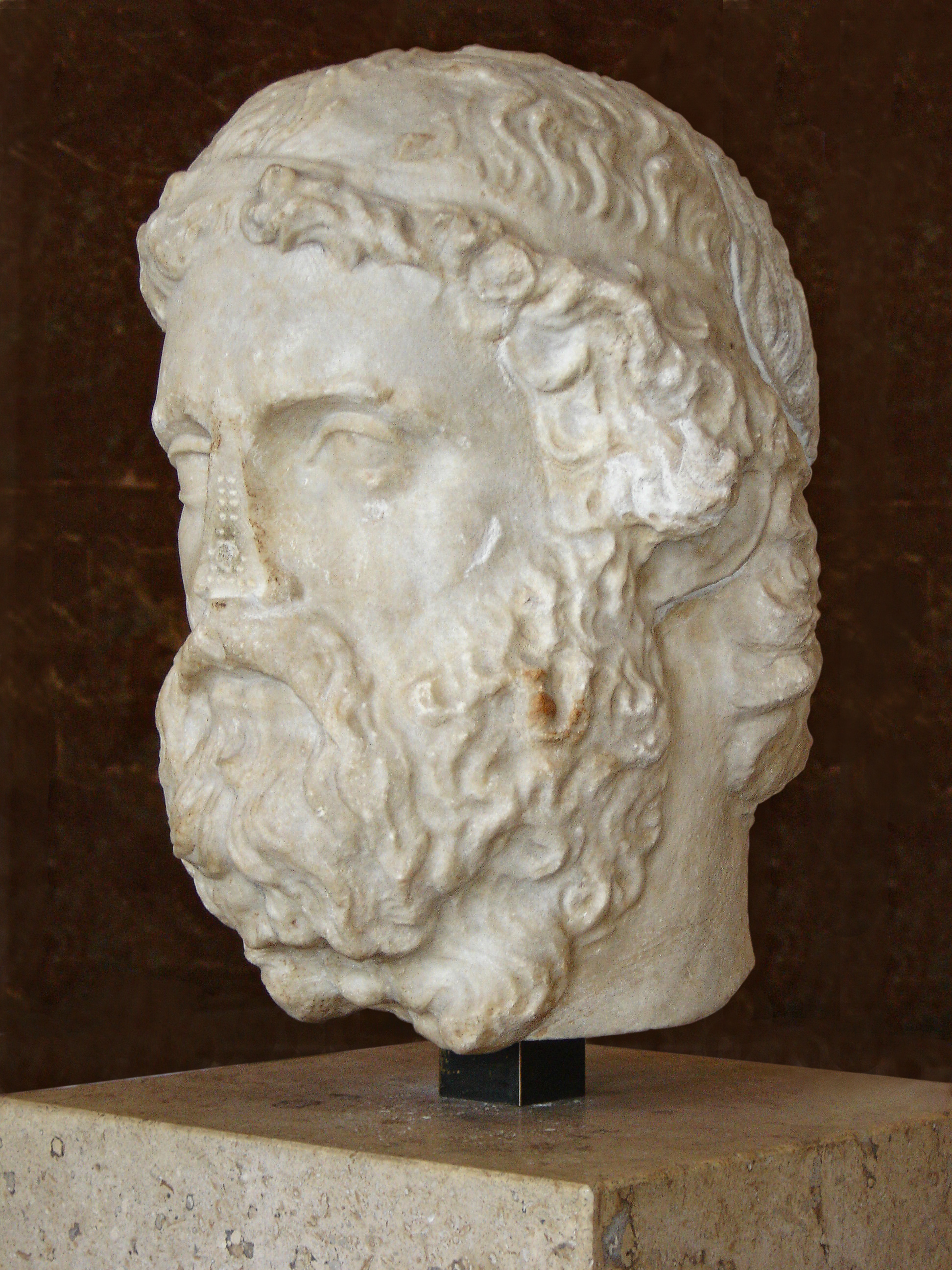
- A bust of Anacreon in the Louvre
- Born: c. 573 BC; Teos, Ionia (modern Turkey)
- Died: c. 495 BC (aged c. 78)
- Occupation: Lyric poet
- Known for: Drinking songs, erotic poems, being one of the Nine Lyric Poets

Anacreon (Note: /əˈnækriən/; Ancient Greek: Ἀνακρέων ὁ Τήϊος) (c. 573 – c. 495 BC) was an Ancient Greek lyric poet, notable for his drinking songs and erotic poems. Later Greeks included him in the canonical list of Nine Lyric Poets. Anacreon wrote all of his poetry in the ancient Ionic dialect. Like all early lyric poetry, it was composed to be sung or recited to the accompaniment of music, usually the lyre. Anacreon's poetry touched on universal themes of love, infatuation, disappointment, revelry, parties, festivals, and the observations of everyday people and life.

== Life ==
Anacreon lived in the sixth century BC. His exact year of birth is not known, with the general scholarly consensus being that he was likely born in the 570s BC: Hans Bernsdorff says c. 575, David Campbell says c. 570. The Suda reports four possible names for his father: Eumelus, Aristocritus, Parthenius, and Scythinus. Ancient sources agree that Anacreon came from Teos, on the coast of Ionia (modern Turkey); this tradition is attested as early as Herodotus, and at least one of Anacreon's fragments mentions the city. When Teos was conquered by Persia in the 540s BC, the Teians moved to Abdera, Thrace; Anacreon was probably already an adult.

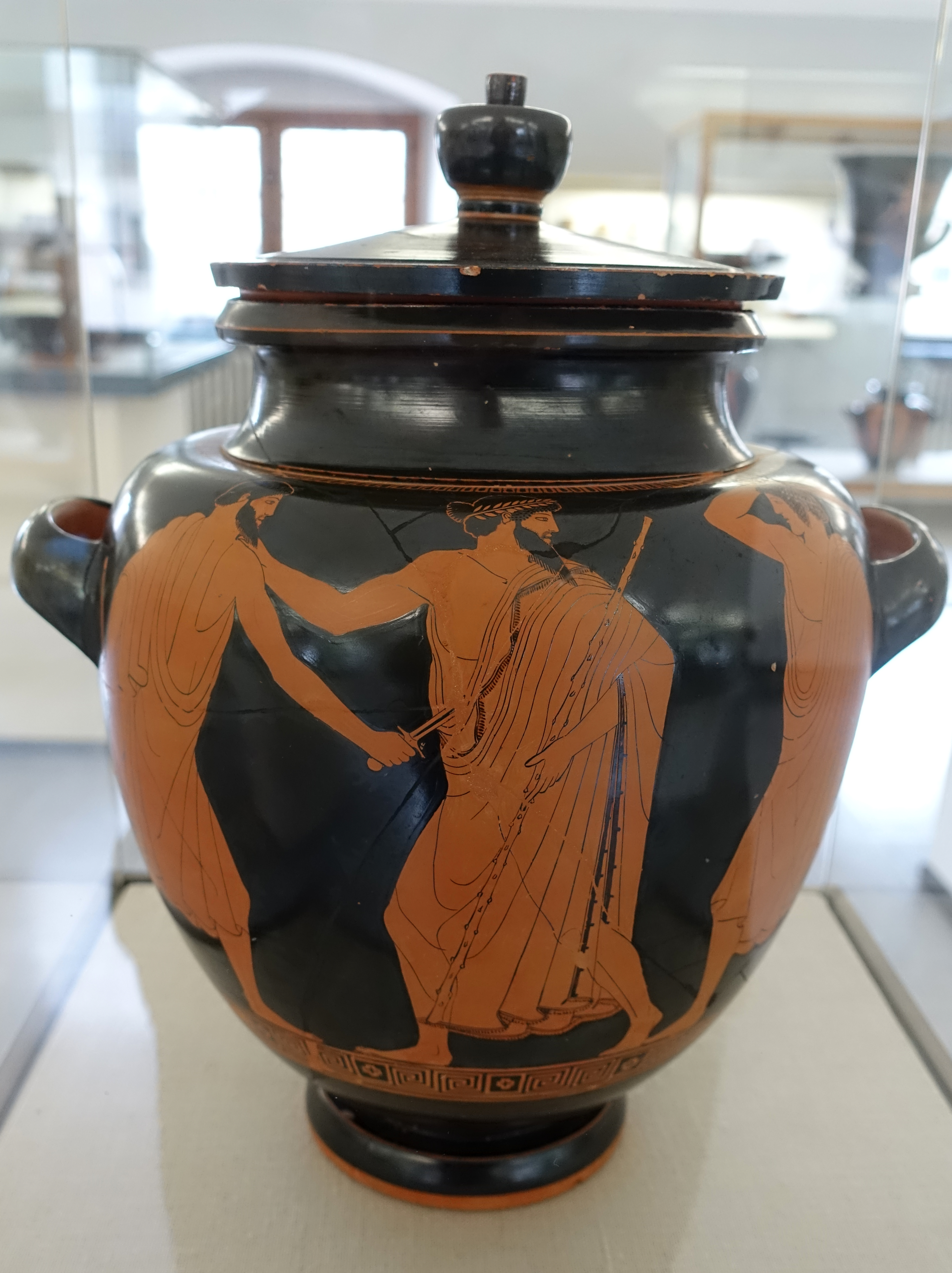
Red-figure vase depicting the assassination of Anacreon's Athenian patron Hipparchus

Anacreon spent time in Samos. According to Himerius, he was invited there to educate Polycrates, the future tyrant of Samos, who Strabo reports was one of the main subjects of his poetry. If Himerius is correct and Anacreon arrived on Samos before Polycrates became tyrant, this would have been before 530 BC. From Samos, Anacreon moved to Athens on the invitation of Hipparchus, presumably sometime after Hipparchus came to power in 528/7; according to Herodotus he was still on Samos in 522 when Polycrates was murdered.

Ancient sources do not record if or when Anacreon left Athens. He may have left after the assassination of his patron Hipparchus in 514, or the expulsion of Hipparchus' brother Hippias in 510, though there is some evidence of his presence in the city later than this. Two epigrams from the Greek Anthology suggest that he spent some time in Thessaly, though Gregory Hutchinson doubts this tradition.

Anacreon probably died at the beginning of the fifth century: Hutchinson says around 500, Bernsdorff suggests 495, and Campbell says 485. According to Valerius Maximus, he died by choking on a grape seed, though this is generally considered apocryphal. An epigram in the Greek Anthology says that his tomb was on Teos.

== Poetry ==
=== Form and style ===
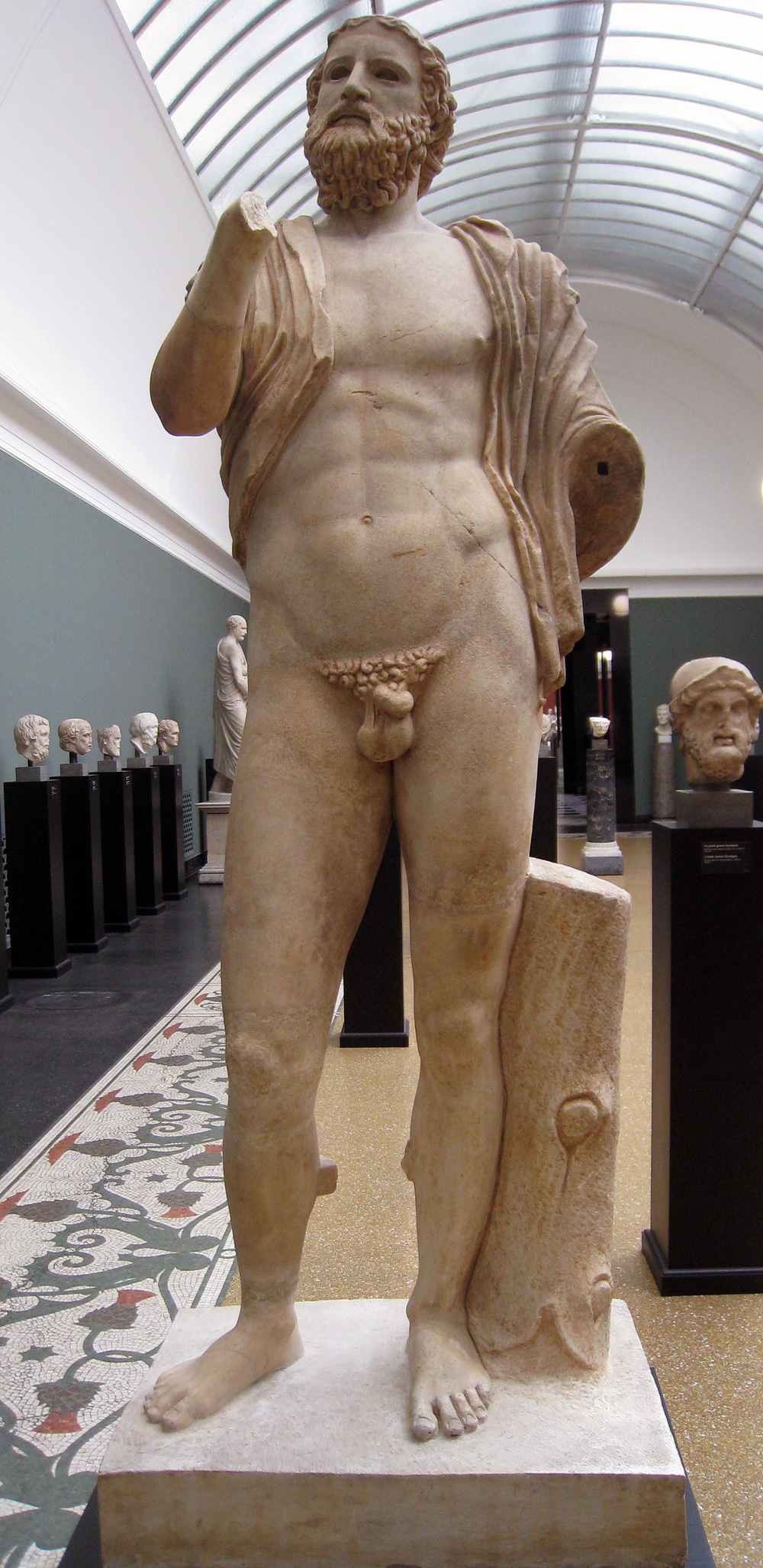
Anacreon singing and playing his lyre.

Anacreon wrote all of his poetry in the ancient Ionic dialect. Like all early lyric poetry, it was composed to be sung or recited to the accompaniment of music, usually the lyre. Anacreon's verses were primarily in the form of monody rather than for a chorus.

In keeping with Greek poetic tradition, his poetry relied on the meter for its construction. Metrical poetry is a particularly rhythmic form, deriving its structure from patterns of phonetic features within and between the lines of verse. The phonetic patterning in Anacreon's poetry, like all the Greek poetry of the day, is found in the structured alternation of "long" and "short" syllables. The Ionic dialect also had a tonal aspect to it that lends a natural melodic quality to the recitation. Anacreon's meters include the anacreonteus.

The Greek language is particularly well suited to this metrical style of poetry but the sound of the verses does not easily transfer to English. As a consequence, translators have historically tended to substitute rhyme, stress rhythms, stanzaic patterning and other devices for the style of the originals, with the primary, sometimes only, connection to the Greek verses being the subject matter. More recent translators have tended to attempt a more spare translation which, though losing the sound of the originals, may be more true to their flavor. A sample of a translation in the English rhyming tradition is included below.

=== Themes and subjects ===
Anacreon's poetry touched on universal themes of love, infatuation, disappointment, revelry, parties, festivals, and observations of everyday people and life. It is the subject matter of Anacreon's poetry that helped to keep it familiar and enjoyable to generations of readers and listeners. His widespread popularity inspired countless imitators, which also kept his name alive.

Anacreon had a reputation as a composer of hymns, as well as of those bacchanalian and amatory lyrics which are commonly associated with his name. Two short hymns to Artemis and Dionysus, consisting of eight and eleven lines respectively, stand first amongst his few undisputed remains, as printed by recent editors. But hymns, especially when addressed to such deities as Aphrodite, Eros and Dionysus, are not so very unlike what we call "Anacreontic" poetry as to make the contrast of style as great as the word might seem to imply. The tone of Anacreon's lyric effusions has probably led to an unjust estimate, by both ancients and moderns, of the poet's personal character. The "triple worship" of the Muses, Wine and Love, ascribed to him as his religion in an old Greek epigram, may have been as purely professional in the two last cases as in the first, and his private character on such points was probably neither much better nor worse than that of his contemporaries. Athenaeus remarks acutely that he seems at least to have been sober when he wrote. His character was an issue, because, according to Pausanias, his statue on the Acropolis of Athens depicts him as drunk. He himself strongly repudiates, as Horace does, the brutal characteristics of intoxication as fit only for barbarians and Scythians.

Of the five books of lyrical pieces by Anacreon which the Suda and Athenaeus mention as extant in their time, only the merest fragments exist today, collected from the citations of later writers.

A collection of poems by numerous, anonymous imitators was long believed to be the works of Anacreon himself. Known as the Anacreontea, it was preserved in a 10th-century manuscript which also included the Palatine Anthology. The poems themselves appear to have been composed over a long period of time, dating to between the 1st century BC and the 6th century AD. They reflect the light-hearted elegance of much of Anacreon's genuine works although they were not written in the same Ionic Greek dialect that Anacreon used. They also display literary references and styles more common to the time of their actual composition.

=== A translated poem ===
Typical of most efforts at translation, this 19th-century one by Walter Headlam takes the subject matter of Anacreon's verses and works them into a rhyming style typical of the English poetry written in Headlam's day. The subject of the poem still remains: Anacreon complaining that a young woman, whom he compares to a Thracian filly, does not recognize his amatory skills.

Ah tell me why you turn and fly,
My little Thracian filly shy?
Why turn askance
That cruel glance,
And think that such a dunce am I?

O I am blest with ample wit
To fix the bridle and the bit,
And make thee bend
Each turning-end
In harness all the course of it.

But now 'tis yet the meadow free
And frisking it with merry glee;
The master yet
Has not been met
To mount the car and manage thee.

== Reception ==
=== Ancient ===
Anacreon was already famous in his own lifetime, depicted on Athenian red-figure vase paintings while he was still alive. His writings influenced fifth-century Athenian drama, as tragedy adopted his metres, while several surviving comic fragments mention him, and Aristophanes included adaptations of Anacreon's poems in his plays. Ancient philosophical and moralistic writers were divided on Anacreon, with some, such as Plato, portraying him as a wise man, while others condemned him for being too concerned with drunkenness and lust.

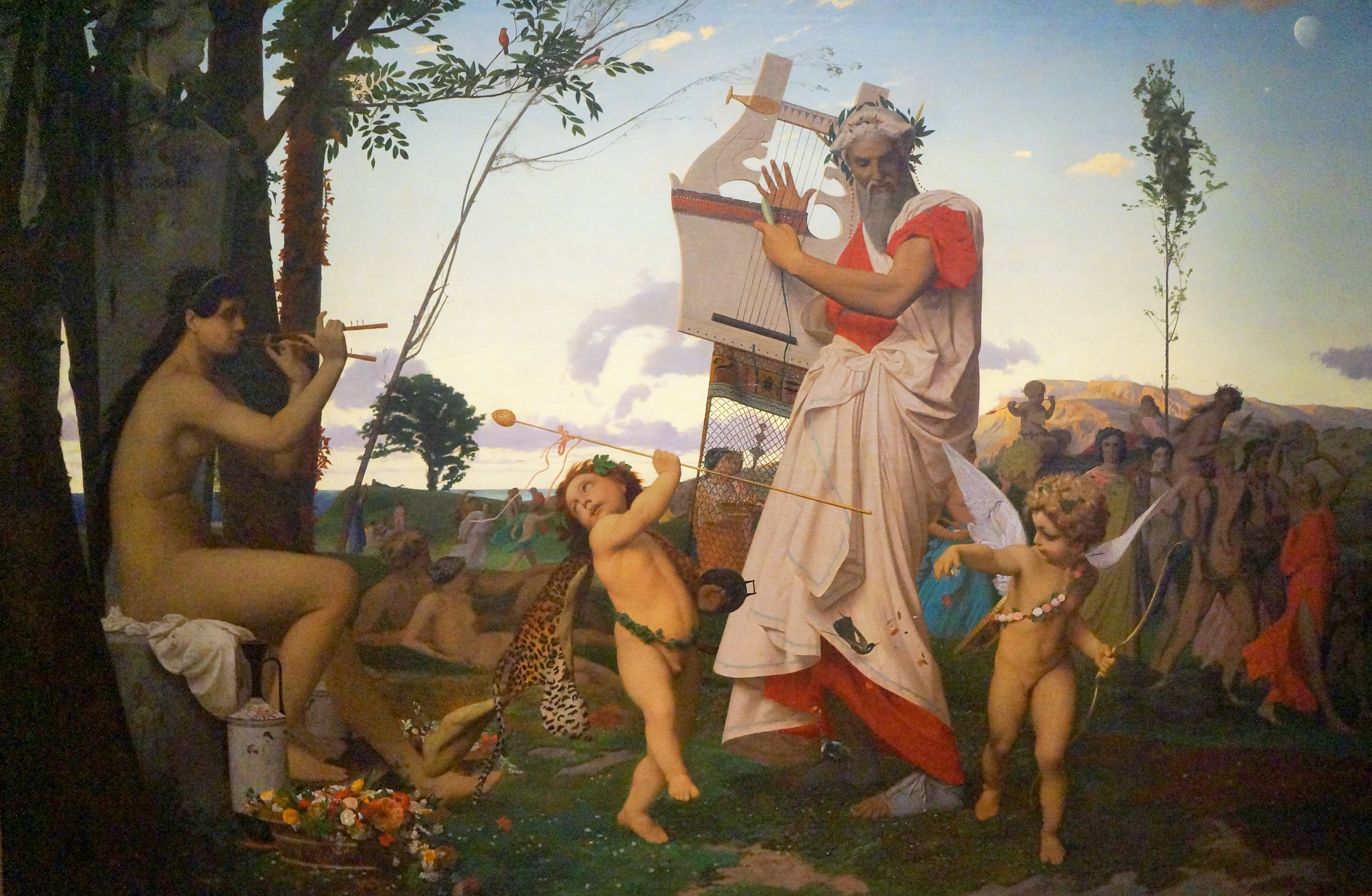
Anachreon, Bachus et l'Amour by Jean-Léon Gérôme

By the Hellenistic period, a caricature of Anacreon as drunken and lustful was established; the poems inspired by Anacreon known as the Anacreontea, composed between the first century BC and the sixth century AD, imitate him in both theme and metre, particularly his erotic and sympotic poetry, while avoiding themes present in Anacreon but which fall outside of the stereotype of him.

Anacreon was respected as a poet and included in the canon of nine lyric poets. The Hellenistic poet Callimachus' "Lock of Berenice" is an adaptation of a poem by Anacreon, Ovid and Propertius allude to him, and he was an important influence on Horace, who refers to him three times in his poetry and frequently alludes to his work.

=== Modern ===
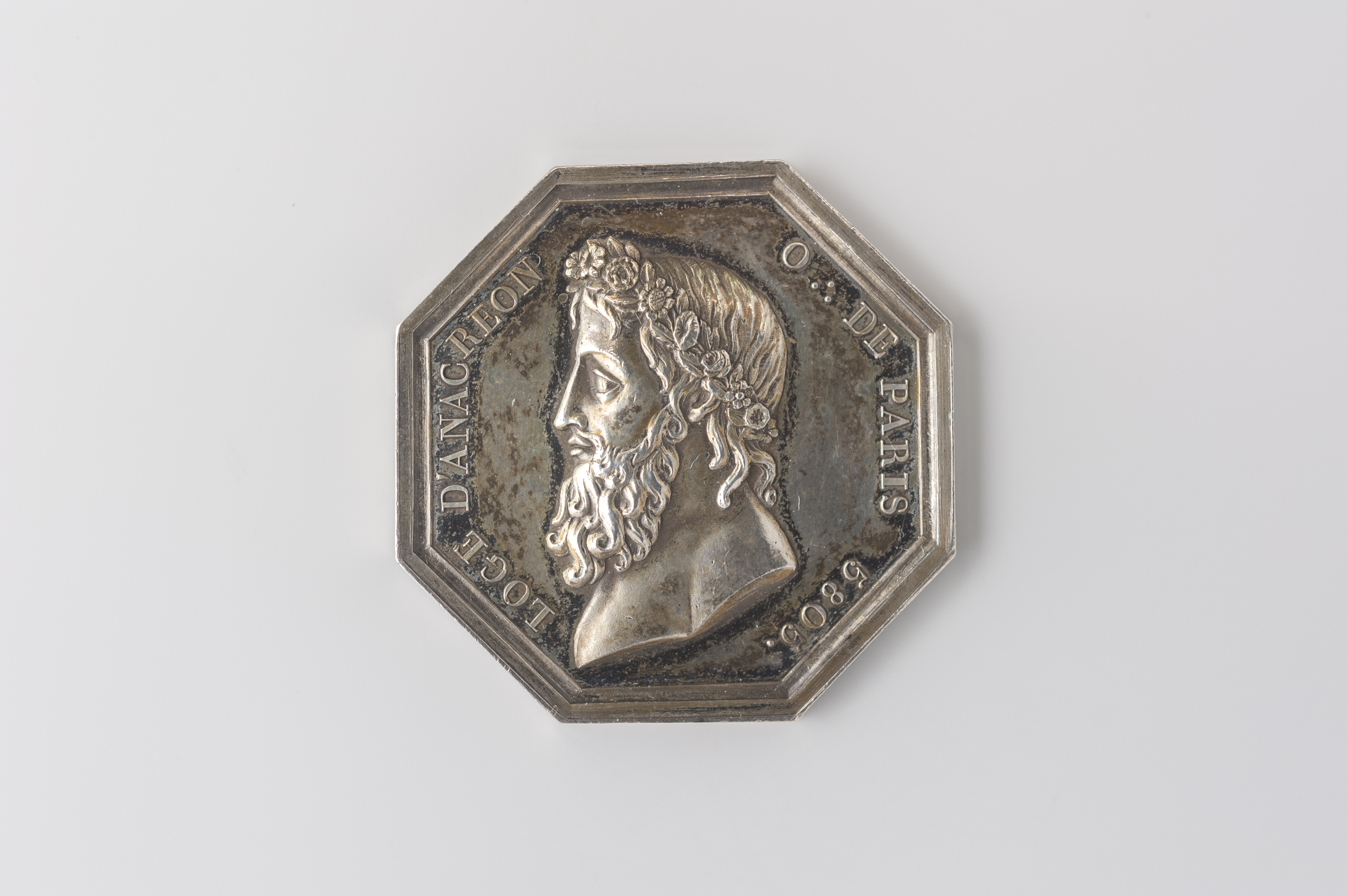
Anacreon depicted on a French lodge token.

The anacreontic meter continued to be used into the medieval period, though the direct influence of Anacreon is uncertain. The Anacreontea were the most important influence on Anacreon's later reception, with the edition of Henricus Stephanus in 1554 initiating a trend for short and playful "Anacreontic" poetry. In the early modern period, Anacreon's poetry was translated into Latin as well as into the vernacular, and poets started once again to adapt his works. The European Anacreontic movement reached its height in the eighteenth century, with Anacreontic groups in Germany, France, and Britain including the London Anacreontic Society (1772–1779).

In the visual arts, Anacreon was largely shown in a biographical or literary context: Raphael painted him in the company of Sappho in Parnassus, while a caricature by Honoré Daumier illustrates the ancient story that he choked to death on a grape seed. The ancient stereotype of Anacreon as the elderly, drunken poet of love was illustrated by Nicolas Poussin and Jean-Léon Gérôme.

== See also ==
- The Anacreontic Song
