= Eros =

Greek god of love and sex

- God of love, lust, desire and sex Primordial god and personification of love
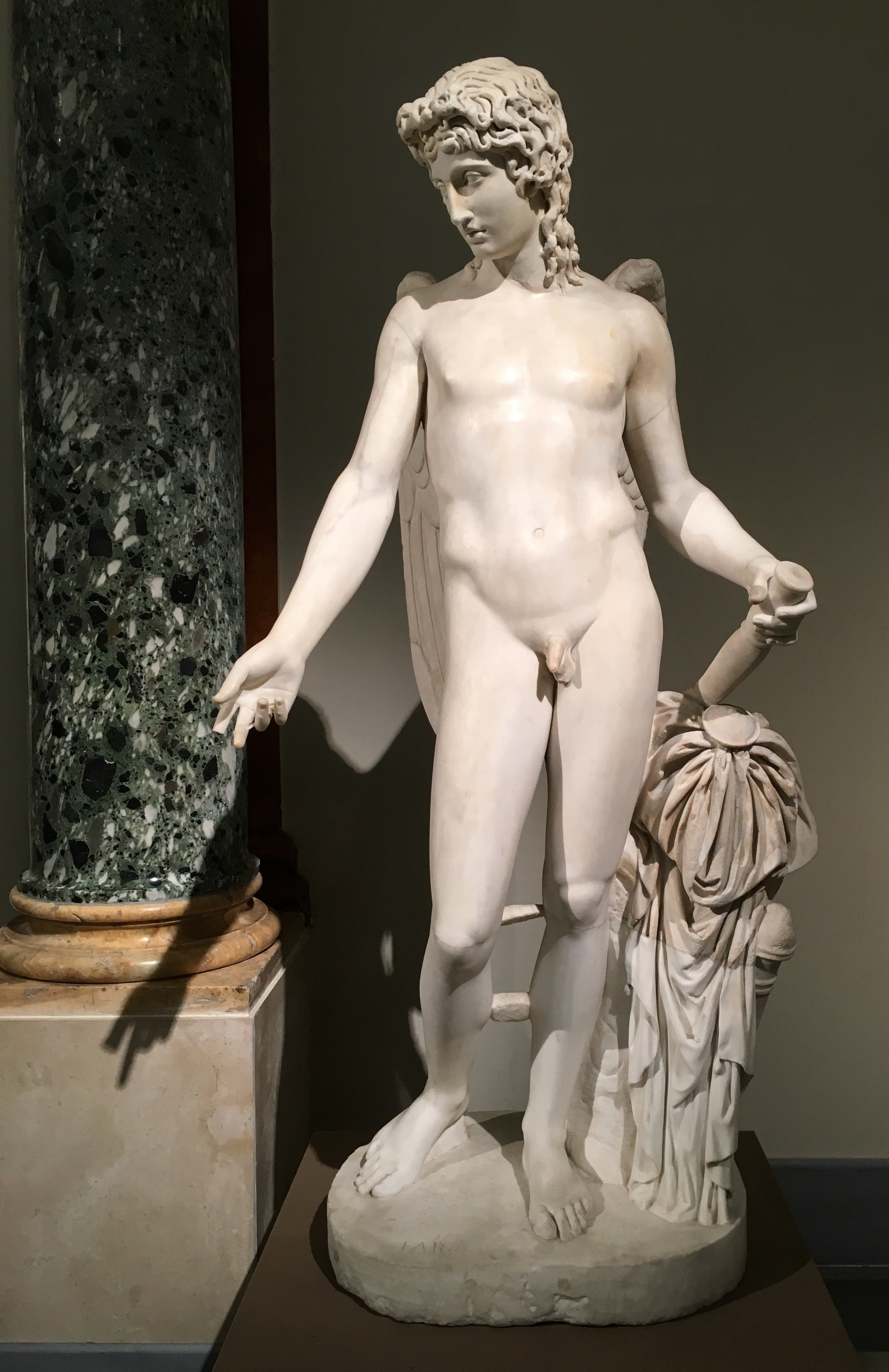
- The Eros Farnese, a Pompeiian marble thought to be a copy of the colossal Eros of Thespiae by Praxiteles
- Major cult center: Thespiae
- Abode: Mount Olympus
- Symbol: Bow and arrows

Genealogy
- Parents: None (Hesiod); Ares and Aphrodite
- Consort: Psyche
- Children: Hedone

Eros (UK: /ˈɪərɒs, ˈɛrɒs/, US: /ˈɛrɒs, ˈɛroʊs/; Ancient Greek: Ἔρως, lit. 'Love, Desire') is the ancient Greek god of love and sex. The Romans referred to him as Cupid or Amor. In the earliest account, he is a primordial god, while in later accounts he is the child of Aphrodite.

He is usually presented as a handsome young man, though in some appearances he is a juvenile boy full of mischief, ever in the company of his mother. In both cases, he is winged and carries his signature bow and arrows, which he uses to make both mortals and immortal gods fall in love, commonly under the guidance of Aphrodite. His role in myths is mostly complementary, and he frequently appears in the presence of Aphrodite and the other love gods, acting as a catalyst for people to fall in love. He has little unique mythology of his own, the most major exception being the myth of Eros and Psyche, the story of how he met and fell in love with his wife.

Eros and Cupid are also known, in art tradition, as a Putto (pl. Putti). The Putto's iconography seemed to have later influenced the figure known as a Cherub (pl. Cherubim). The Putti and the Cherubim can be found throughout the Middle Ages and the Renaissance in Christian art. This latter iteration of Eros/Cupid became a major icon and symbol of Valentine's Day.

== Etymology ==
The Greek ἔρως, éros meaning 'desire' (whence eroticism) comes from the verb ἔραμαι, éramai and in infinitive form ἐρᾶσθαι, erãsthai 'to desire, love', itself of uncertain etymology. R. S. P. Beekes speculates a Pre-Greek origin.

== Cult and depiction ==
Eros appears in ancient Greek sources under several different guises. In the earliest sources (the cosmogonies, the earliest philosophers, and texts referring to the mystery religions), he is one of the primordial gods involved in the coming into being of the cosmos. In later sources, however, Eros is represented as the son of Aphrodite, whose mischievous interventions in the affairs of gods and mortals cause bonds of love to form, often illicitly. Ultimately, in the later satirical poets, he is represented as a blindfolded child, the precursor to the chubby Renaissance Cupid, whereas in early Greek poetry and art, Eros was depicted as a young adult male who embodies sexual power, and a profound artist.

A cult of Eros existed in pre-classical Greece, but it was much less important than that of Aphrodite. However, in late antiquity, Eros was worshiped by a fertility cult in Thespiae. In Athens, he shared a very popular cult with Aphrodite, and the fourth day of every month was sacred to him (also shared by Herakles, Hermes and Aphrodite).

The Thespians celebrated the Erotidia (Ancient Greek: Ἐρωτίδεια) meaning festivals of Eros.

He had the epithet Klêidouchos (Κλειδοῦχος), meaning holding/bearing the keys, because he was holding the key to hearts. In addition, he had the epithet Pandemos (Πάνδημος, "common to all the people").

== Mythology ==
=== Primordial god ===
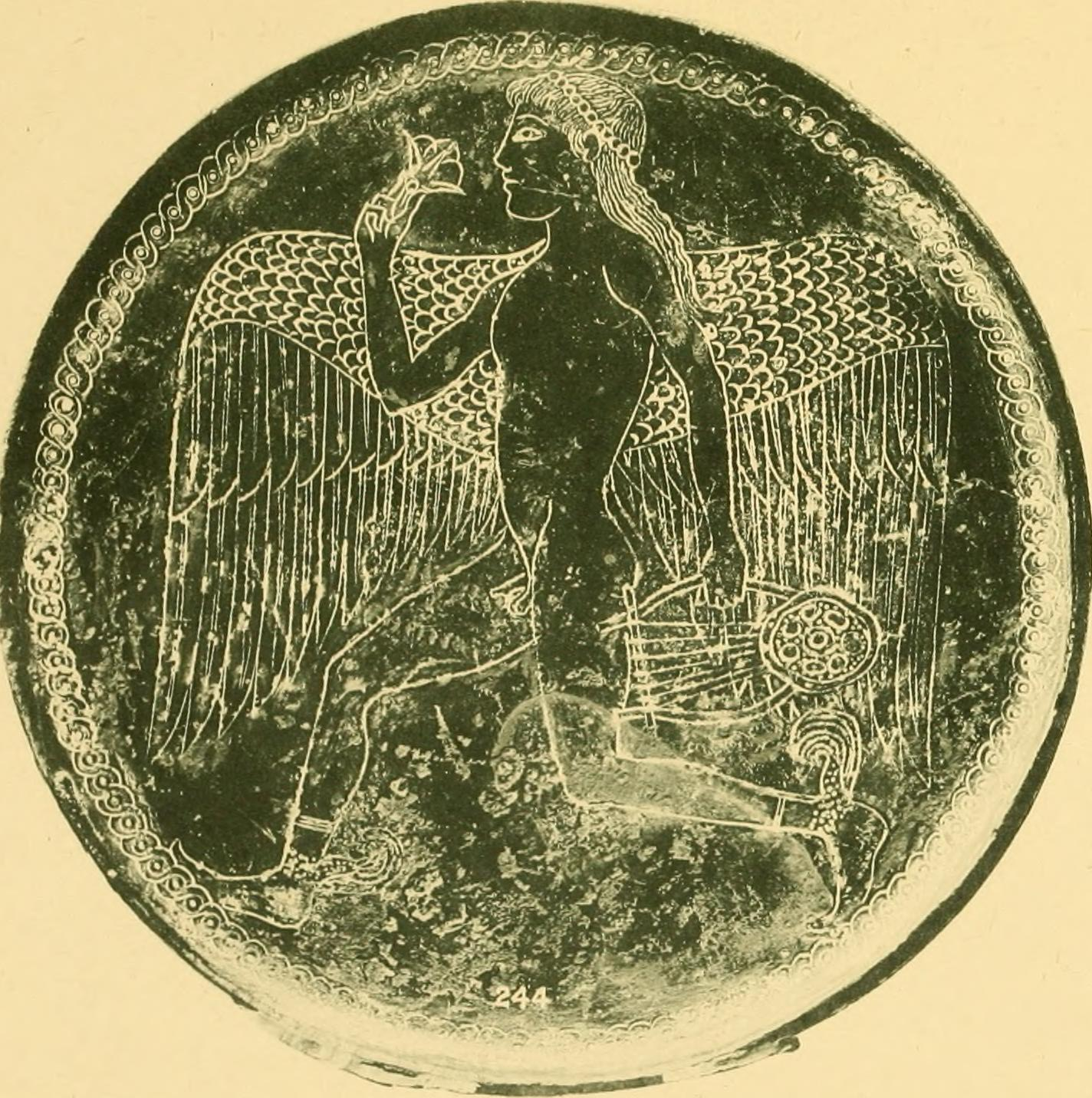
Etruscan or Greek mirror with an engraved depiction of Eros with lyre

According to Hesiod's Theogony (c. 700 BC), one of the most ancient of Greek sources, Eros (Love) was the fourth god to come into existence, coming after Chaos, Gaia (Earth), and Tartarus.

Homer does not mention Eros. However, Parmenides (c. 400 BC), one of the pre-Socratic philosophers, makes Eros the first of all the gods to come into existence.

Aristophanes, in his comedy The Birds (414 BC), presents a parody of a cosmogony which has been considered Orphic, in which Eros is born from an egg laid by Night (Nyx):

At the beginning there was only Chaos, Night, dark Erebus, and deep Tartarus. Earth, the air and heaven had no existence. Firstly, blackwinged Night laid a germless egg in the bosom of the infinite deeps of Erebus, and from this, after the revolution of long ages, sprang the graceful Eros with his glittering golden wings, swift as the whirlwinds of the tempest. He mated in deep Tartarus with dark Chaos, winged like himself, and thus hatched forth our race, which was the first to see the light.

In some versions the Orphic Egg which contains Eros is created by Chronos, and it is Eros who bore Nyx as his daughter and took her as his consort. Eros was called "Protogonos" meaning "first-born" because he was the first of the immortals that could be conceived by man, and was thought of as the creator of all other beings and the first ruler of the universe. Nyx bore to Eros the gods Gaia and Ouranos. Eros passes his scepter of power to Nyx, who then passes it to Ouranos. The primordial Eros was also called Phanes ('illuminated one'), Erikepaios ('power'), Metis ('thought') and Dionysus. Zeus was said to have swallowed Phanes (Eros), and absorbing his powers of creation remade the world anew, such that Zeus was then both creator and ruler of the universe. The Orphics also thought that Dionysus was an incarnation of the primordial Eros, and that Zeus (the modern ruler) passed the scepter of power to Dionysus. Thus Eros was the first ruler of the universe, and as Dionysus he regained the scepter of power once again.

=== Son of Aphrodite ===
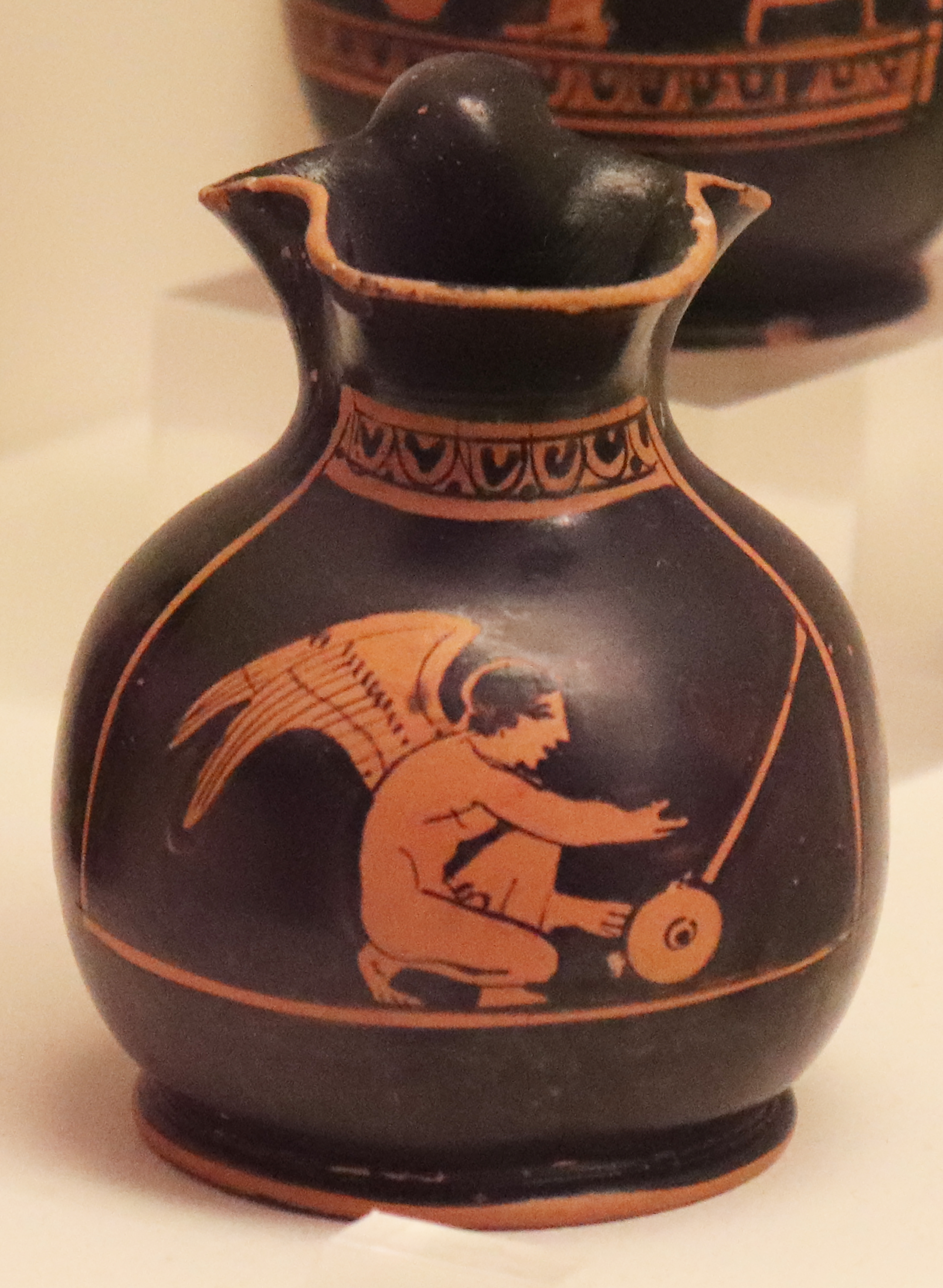
Winged eros with toy cart, National Archaeological museum, Athens

In later myths, he was the son of Aphrodite. The 6th-to-5th-century BC lyric poet Simonides considered him to be the son of Aphrodite and Ares.

- [Hera addresses Athena:]

"We must have a word with Aphrodite. Let us go together and ask her to persuade her boy [Eros], if that is possible, to loose an arrow at Aeetes's daughter, Medea of the many spells, and make her fall in love with Jason ..." (Argonautica)

- "He [Eros] smites maids' breasts with unknown heat, and bids the very gods leave heaven and dwell on earth in borrowed forms." (Phaedra)
- "Once, when Venus' son [Eros] was kissing her, his quiver dangling down, a jutting arrow, unbeknown, had grazed her breast. She pushed the boy away. In fact the wound was deeper than it seemed, though unperceived at first. [And she became] enraptured by the beauty of a man [Adonis]." (Metamorphoses)
- "Eros drove Dionysos mad for the girl [Aura] with the delicious wound of his arrow, then curving his wings flew lightly to Olympus. And the god roamed over the hills scourged with a greater fire." (Dionysiaca)

=== Eros and Psyche ===
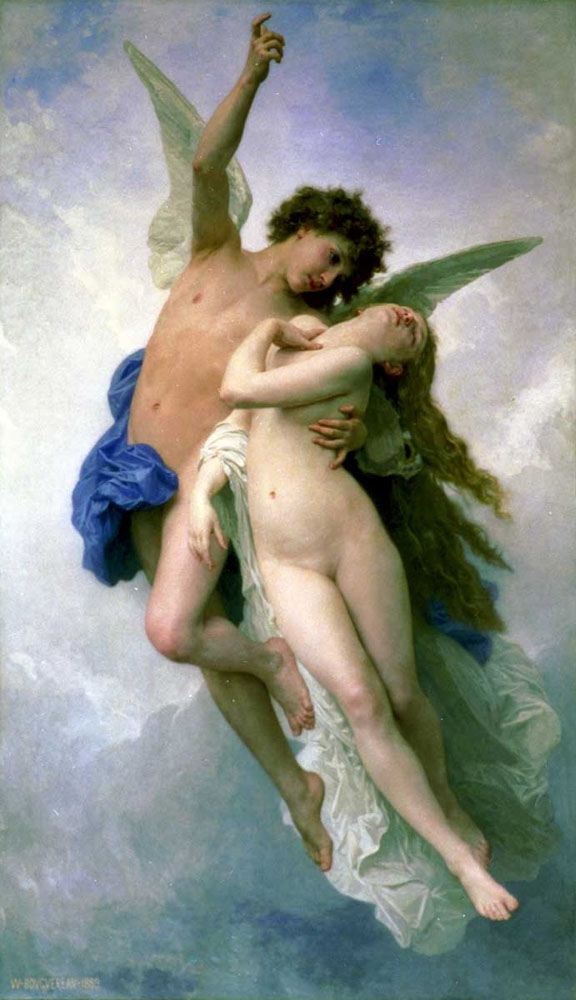
Psyche et L'Amour (1889) by William Bouguereau.

The story of Eros and Psyche has a longstanding tradition as a folktale of the ancient Greco-Roman world long before it was committed to literature in Apuleius's Latin novel, The Golden Ass. The novel itself is written in a picaresque Roman style, yet Psyche retains her Greek name even though Eros and Aphrodite are called by their Latin names (Cupid and Venus). Also, Cupid is depicted as a young adult, rather than a fat winged child (putto amorino).

The story tells of the quest for love and trust between Eros and Psyche. Aphrodite was jealous of the beauty of mortal princess Psyche, as men were leaving her altars barren to worship a mere mortal woman instead, and so she commanded her son Eros, the god of love, to cause Psyche to fall in love with the ugliest creature on earth. Instead, Eros falls in love with Psyche himself and spirits her away to his home. Their fragile peace is ruined by a visit from Psyche's jealous sisters, who cause Psyche to betray the trust of her husband. Wounded both emotionally and physically, Eros leaves his wife, and Psyche wanders the Earth, looking for her lost love. She visits the Temple of Demeter and the Temple of Hera looking for advice. Eventually, she finds her way to Aphrodite's temple and approaches Aphrodite asking for her help. Aphrodite imposes four difficult tasks on Psyche, which she is able to achieve by means of supernatural assistance.

After successfully completing these tasks, Aphrodite relents. After a near death experience, Zeus turns Psyche into an immortal to live amongst the gods with her husband Eros. Together they had a daughter, Voluptas or Hedone (meaning physical pleasure, bliss).

In Greek mythology, Psyche was the deification of the human soul. She was portrayed in ancient mosaics as a goddess with butterfly wings (because psyche was also the Ancient Greek word for "butterfly"). The Greek word psyche literally means "soul, spirit, breath, life, or animating force".

In the Gnostic narrative found in On the Origin of the World, Eros, during the universe's creation, is scattered in all the creatures of Chaos, existing between the midpoint of light and darkness as well as the angels and people. Later, Psyche pours her blood upon him, causing the first rose to sprout up on the Earth, followed by every flower and herb.

=== Dionysiaca ===
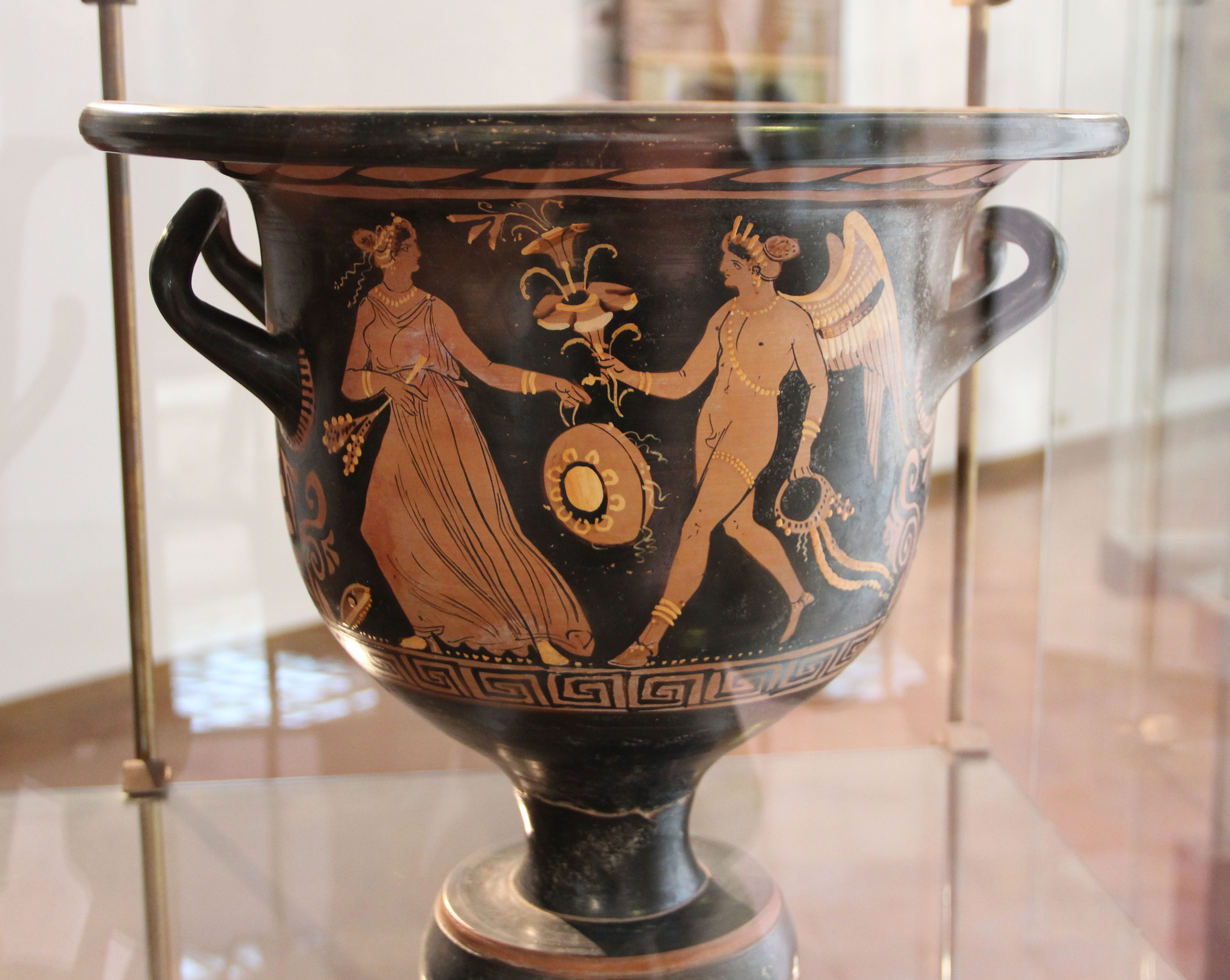
Eros and a Maenad, Museum of Agrigento

Eros features in two Dionysus-related myths. In the first, Eros made Hymnus, a young shepherd, to fall in love with the beautiful Naiad Nicaea. Nicaea never reciprocated Hymnus's affection, and he in desperation asked her to kill him. She fulfilled his wish, but Eros, disgusted with Nicaea's actions, made Dionysus fall in love with her by hitting him with a love arrow. Nicaea rejected Dionysus, so he filled the spring she used to drink from with wine. Intoxicated, Nicaea lay to rest as Dionysus raped her. Afterwards, she sought to find him seeking revenge, but never found him.

In the other, one of Artemis's maiden nymphs Aura boasted of being better than her mistress, due to having a virgin's body, as opposed to Artemis's sensuous and lush figure, thereby bringing into question Artemis's virginity. Artemis, angered, asked Nemesis, the goddess of vengeance and retribution, to avenge her, and Nemesis ordered Eros to make Dionysus fall in love with Aura. The tale then continues in the same manner as Nicaea's myth; Dionysus gets Aura drunk and then rapes her.

=== Other myths ===
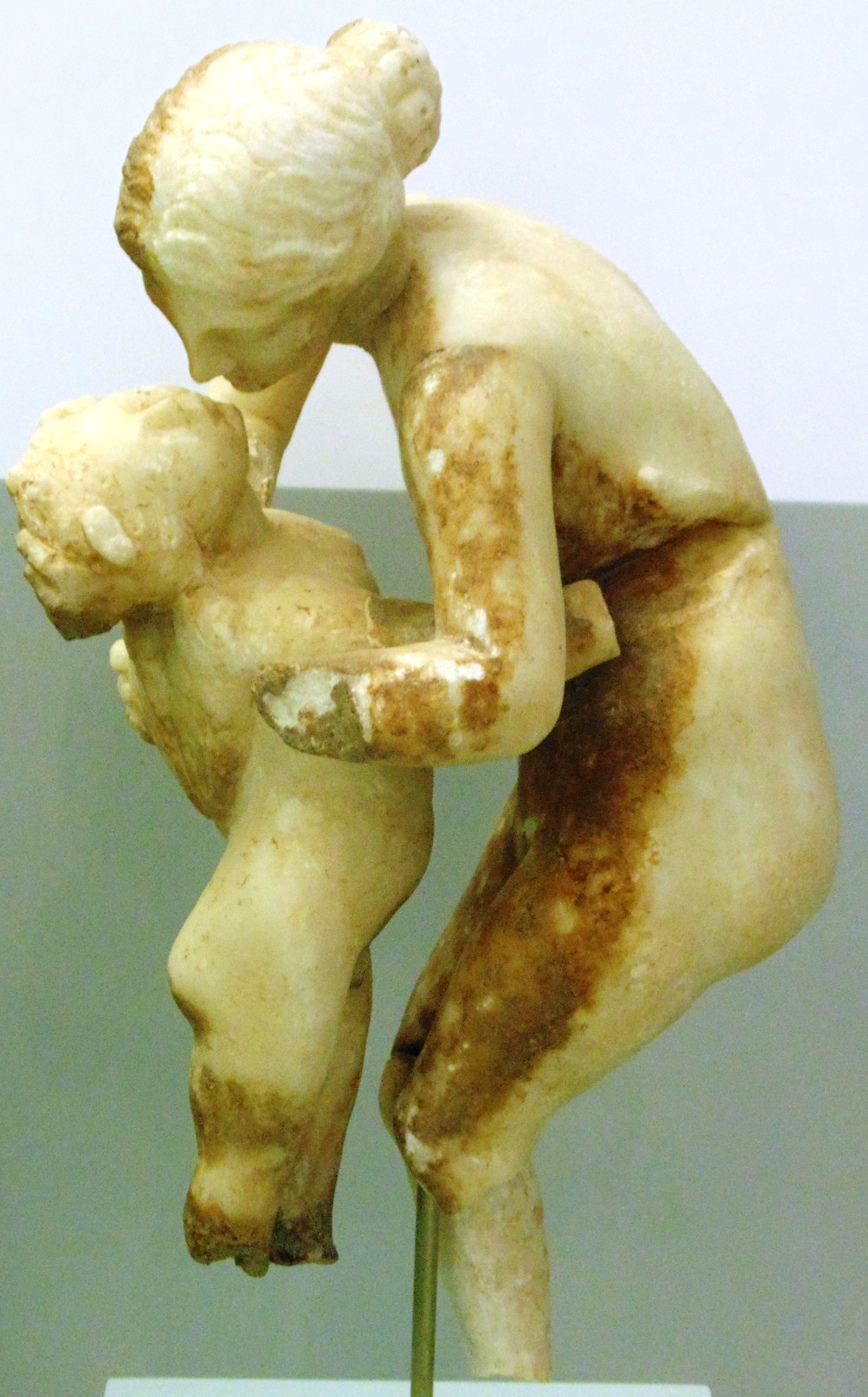
Statuette of Eros with his mother Aphrodite, 2nd-1st cent. BC, Eretria.

Eros made two chaste hunting companions of Artemis, Rhodopis and Euthynicus, to fall in love with each other at the behest of his mother Aphrodite, who took offence at them rejecting her domain of love and marriage. Artemis then punished Rhodopis by turning her into a fountain.

In another myth, Eros and Aphrodite played in a meadow, and had a light competition about which would gather the most flowers. Eros was in the lead thanks to his swift wings, but then a nymph named Peristera ("dove") gathered some flowers herself and handed them over to Aphrodite, making her victorious. Eros turned Peristera into a dove.

According to Porphyrius, Themis, the goddess of justice, played a role in Eros growing up. His mother Aphrodite once complained to Themis that Eros did not grow and remained a perpetual child, so Themis advised her to give him a brother. Aphrodite then gave birth to Anteros (meaning "counter-love"), and whenever he was near him, Eros grew. But if Anteros was away, Eros shrank back to his previous, smaller size.

Another time, when Eros had assumed his child-like appearance and tried bending his bow, the god Apollo, who was similarly an archer god as well, mocked him by saying that he should leave the weapons to the older gods, and bragged about his slaying of Python. Eros was angered, so he immediately struck Apollo with a love arrow, making him fall in love with Daphne, a virginal nymph of the woods. In the same fashion he struck Daphne with a lead arrow, which had the opposite effect, and made the nymph be repulsed by Apollo and his ardent wooing. In the end, Daphne would be transformed into a tree in order to escape the god's advances.

== Attributes ==
=== Bow and arrows ===
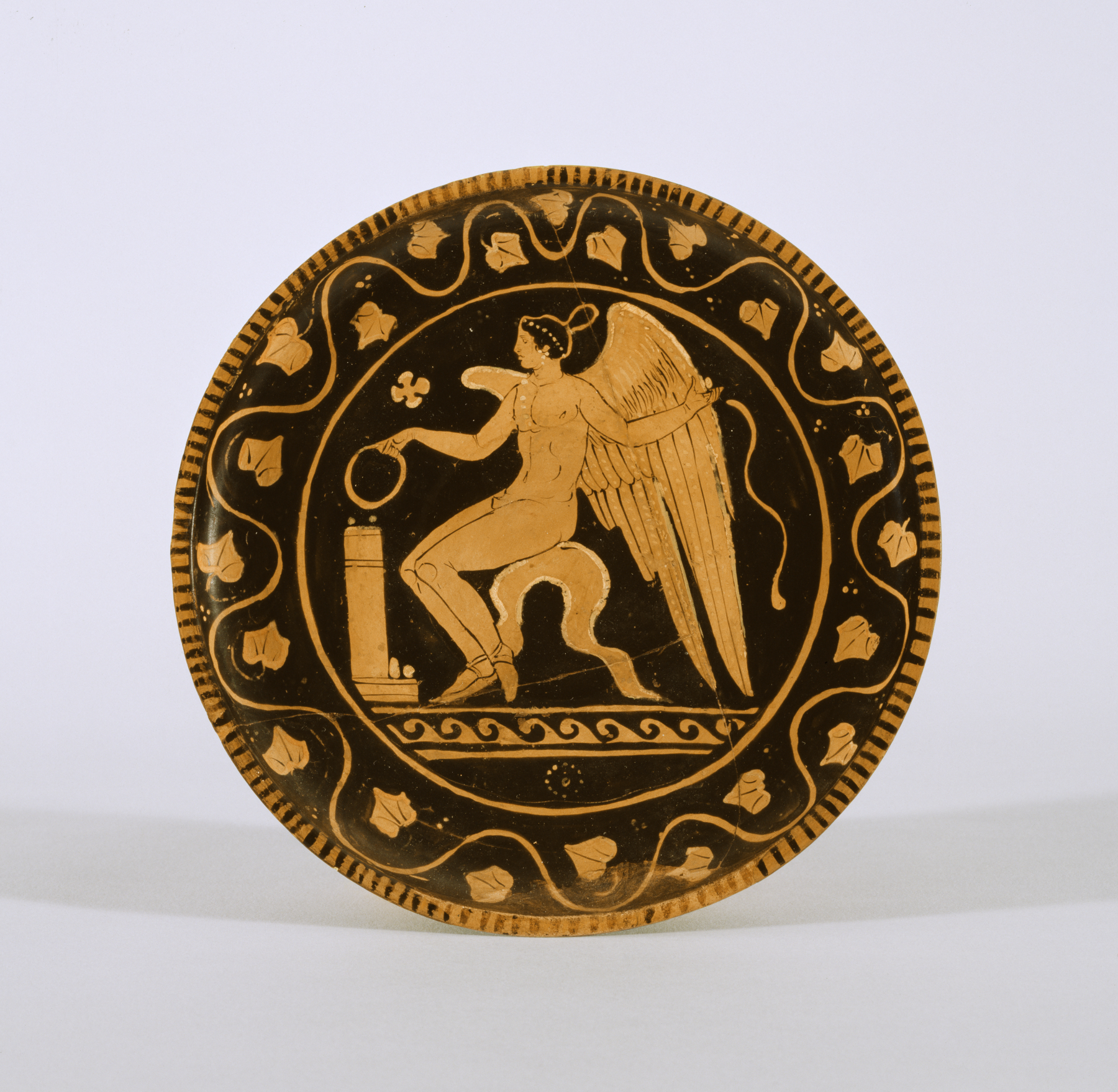
Plate with Eros; 340–320 BC; red-figure terracotta; Walters Art Museum

Eros is imagined as a beautiful youth who carries bow and powerful arrows which he uses to make anyone fall madly in love. Ovid, a Roman author, elaborates on Eros's arsenal and specifies that Eros carries two kinds of arrows; the first are his golden arrows which induce a powerful feeling of love and affection on their target. The second kind are made of lead instead, and have the opposite effect; they make people averse to love, and fill their hearts with hatred. This is mostly utilized in the story of Daphne and Apollo, where Eros made Apollo fall in love with the nymph, and Daphne to detest any forms of romance. Meanwhile, in Ovid's tale of Persephone's abduction by Hades, the abduction is initiated by Aphrodite and Eros; Aphrodite commands Eros to make Hades fall in love with his niece, so that their domain can reach the Underworld. Eros has to use his strongest possible arrow to make Hades's stern heart melt.

In an Anacreon fragment, preserved by Athenaeus, the author laments how Eros struck him with a purple ball, making him fall in love with a woman who is attracted to other women, and shuns him over his white hair.

Eros is characterized as a mighty entity who controls everyone, and even immortals cannot escape. Lucian satirized this concept in his Dialogues of the Gods, where Zeus chides Eros for making him fall in love with and then deceive so many mortal women, and even his mother Aphrodite advises him against using all the gods as his playthings. Nevertheless, Eros could not touch any of the virgin goddesses (Hestia, Athena and Artemis) who had all taken a vow of purity. Sappho writes of Artemis that "limb-loosening Eros never goes near her."

=== Eros and the bees ===
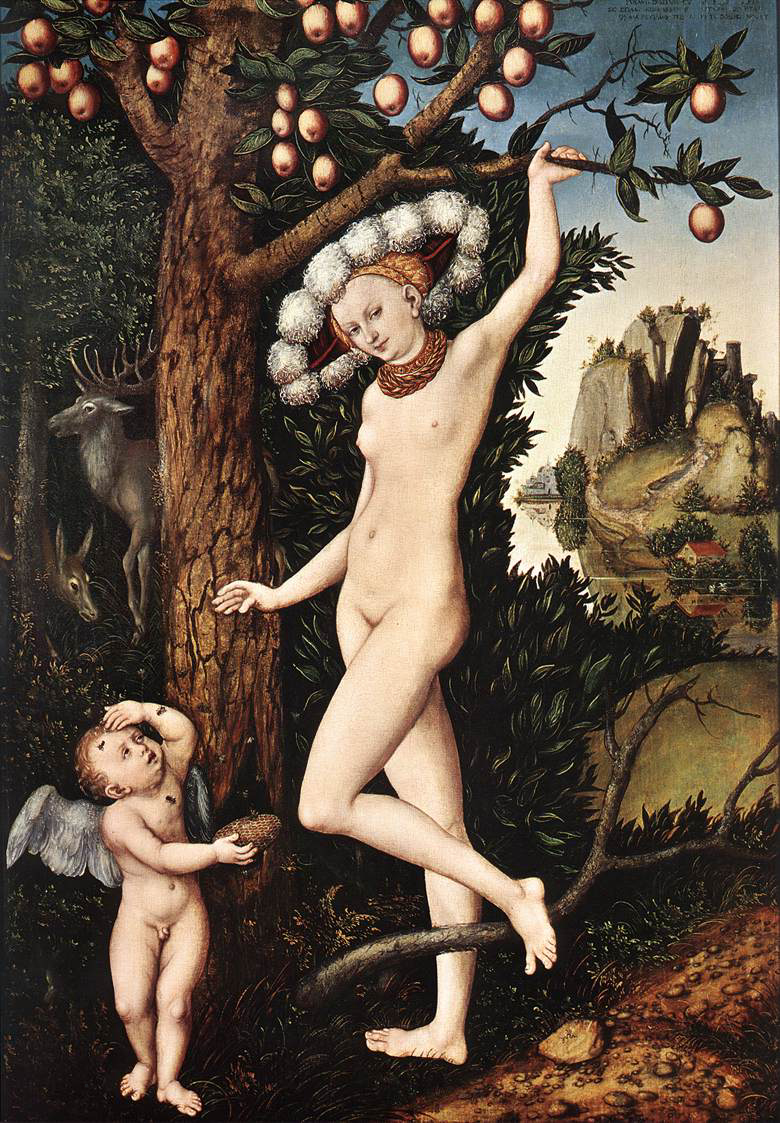
Cupid the Honey Thief, by Lucas Cranach the Elder

A repetitive motif in ancient poetry included Eros being stung by bees. The story is first found in the Anacreontea, attributed to sixth century BC author Anacreon, and goes that Eros once went to his mother Aphrodite crying about being stung by a bee, and compared the small creature to a snake with wings. Aphrodite then asks him, if he thinks the bee's sting hurts so much, what he thinks about the pain his own arrows cause.

Theocritus, coming a bit later during the fourth century BC, expanded the anecdote a little in his Idylls (Idyll XIX). Little Eros is stung by bees when he attempts to steal honey from their beehive. The bees pierce all of his fingers. He runs to his mother crying, and muses how creatures this small and cause pain so big. Aphrodite smiles and compares him to the bees, as he too is small, and causes pain much greater than his size.

This little tale was retold in antiquity and Renaissance many times.

=== God of friendship and liberty ===
Pontianus of Nicomedia, a character in Deipnosophistae by Athenaeus, asserts that Zeno of Citium thought that Eros was the god of friendship and liberty.

Erxias (Ἐρξίας) wrote that the Samians consecrated a gymnasium to Eros. The festival instituted in his honour was called the Eleutheria (Ἐλευθέρια), meaning "liberty".

The Lacedaemonians offered sacrifices to Eros before they went into battle, thinking that safety and victory depend on the friendship of those who stand side by side in the battle. In addition, the Cretans offered sacrifices to Eros in their line of battle.

== Eros in art ==
Eros in art

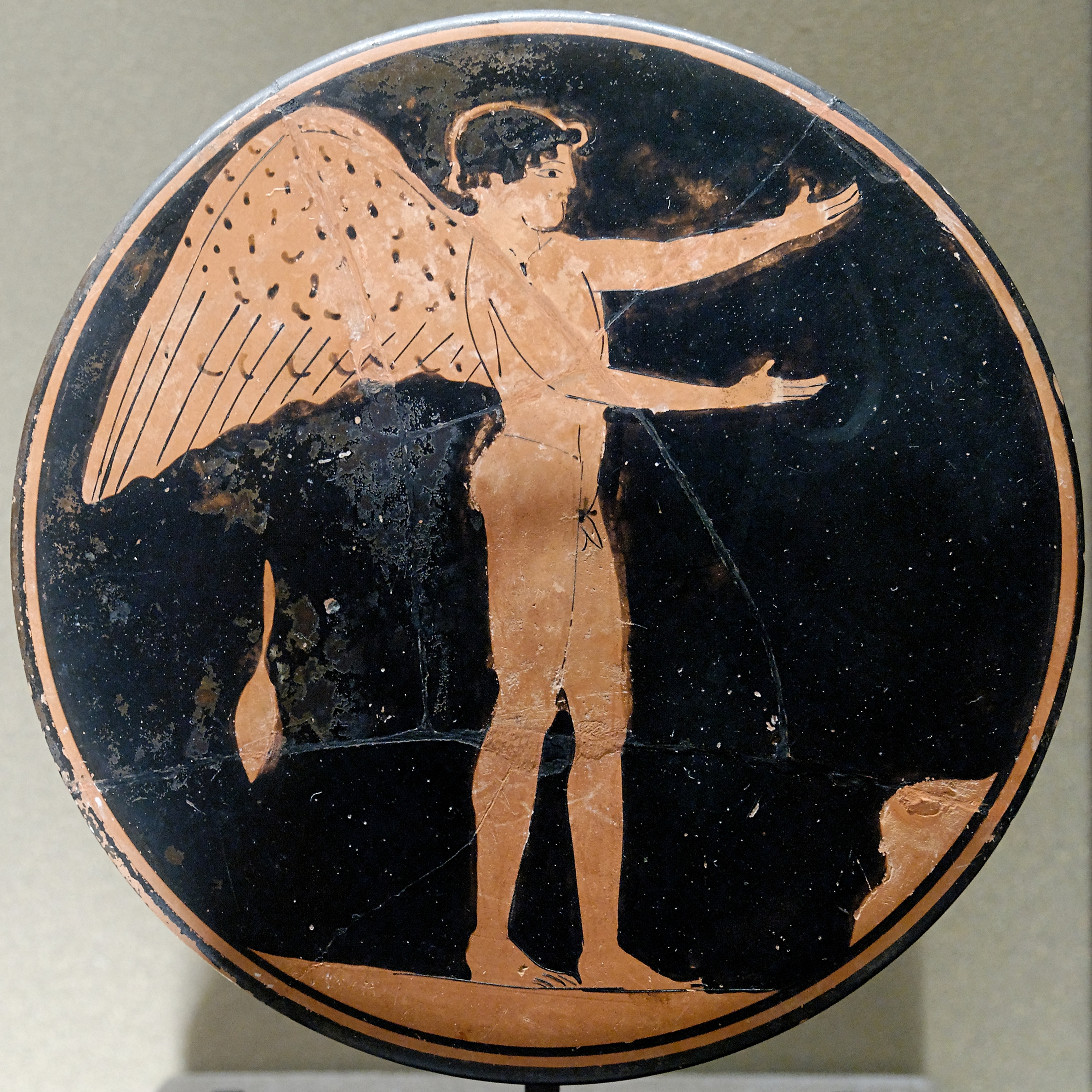
Bobbin with Eros; 470–450 BC; red-figure pottery; height: 2.6 cm, diameter: 11.8 cm; Louvre

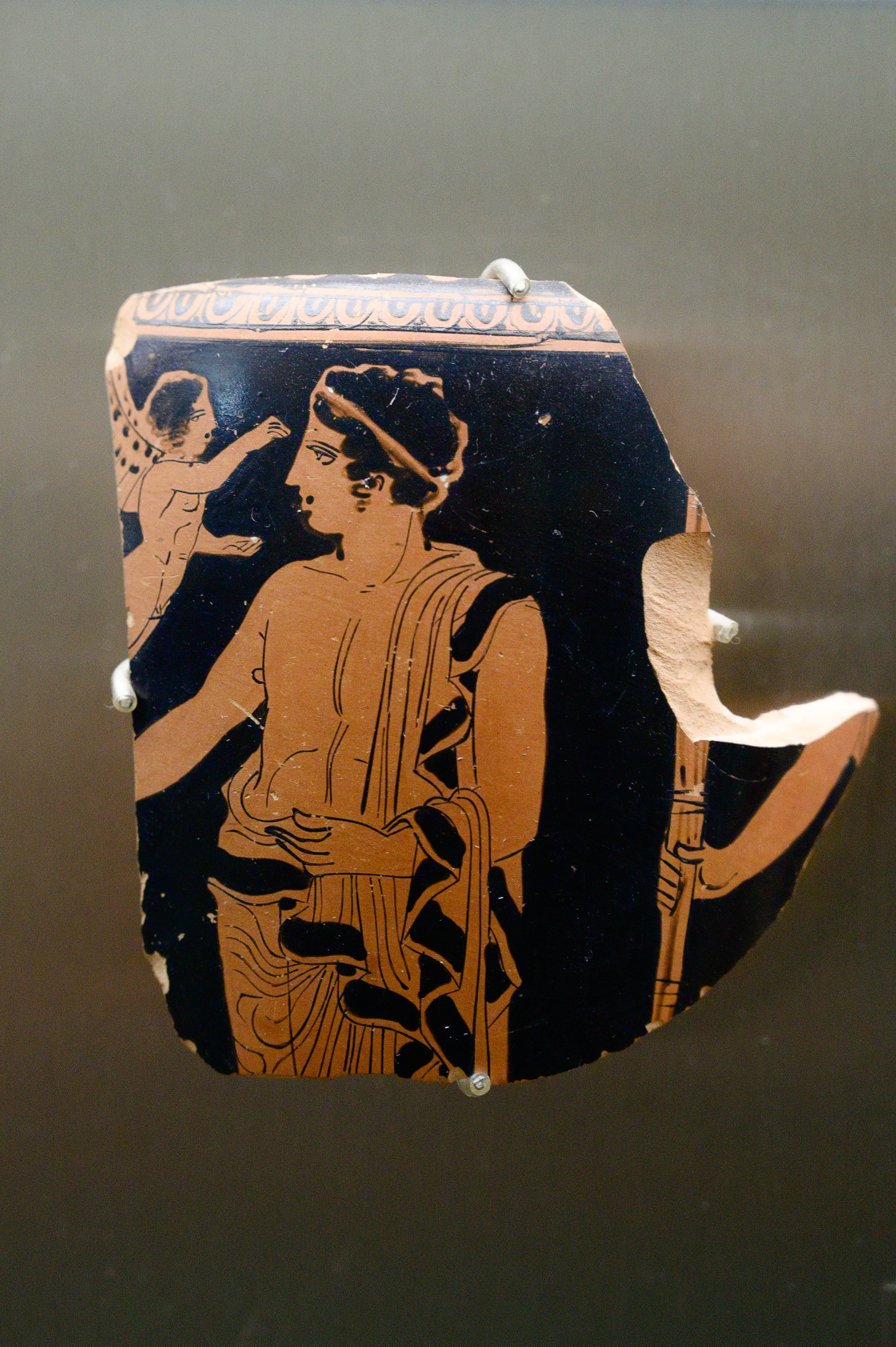
Groom and Eros. red-figure pottery fragment, 450–425 BC. Acropolis Museum, Athens.

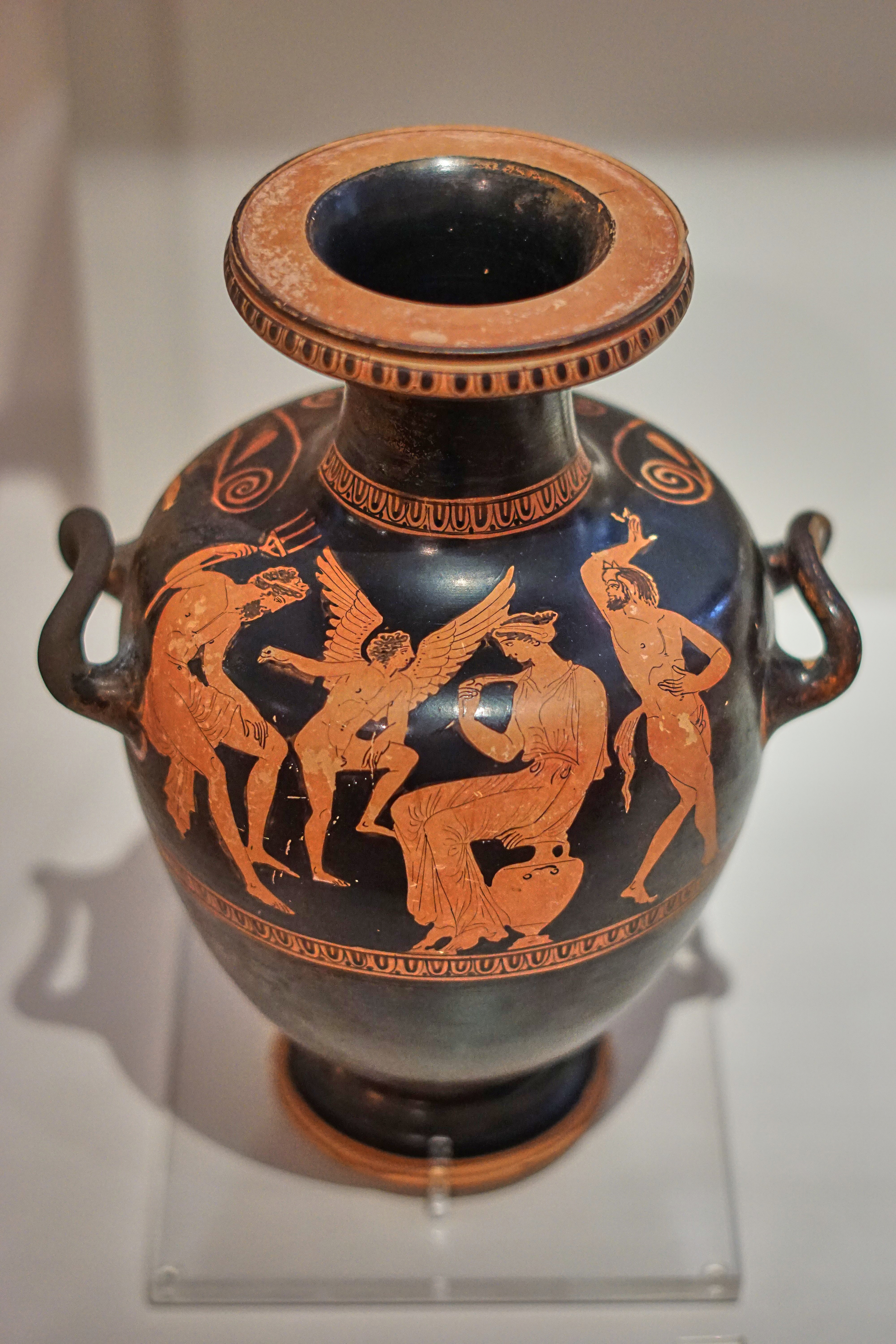
Hydria of Eros between Poseidon, Amymone, and a Satyr; 375-350 B.C.; red-figure pottery; National Archaeological Museum, Athens

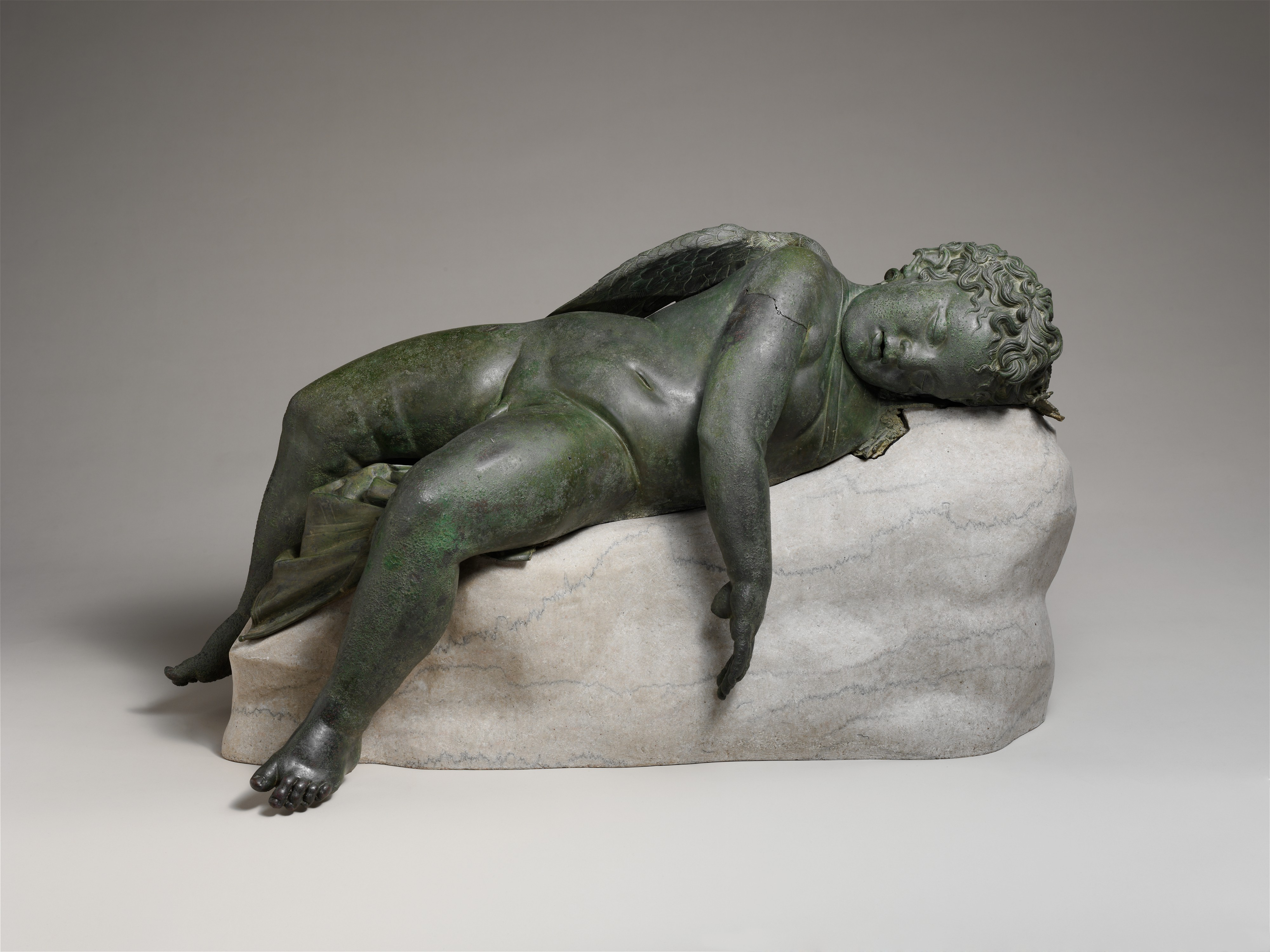
Statue of Eros sleeping; 3rd–2nd century BC; bronze; 41.9 × 35.6 × 85.2 cm, 124.7 kg, height with base: 45.7 cm; Metropolitan Museum of Art (New York City)

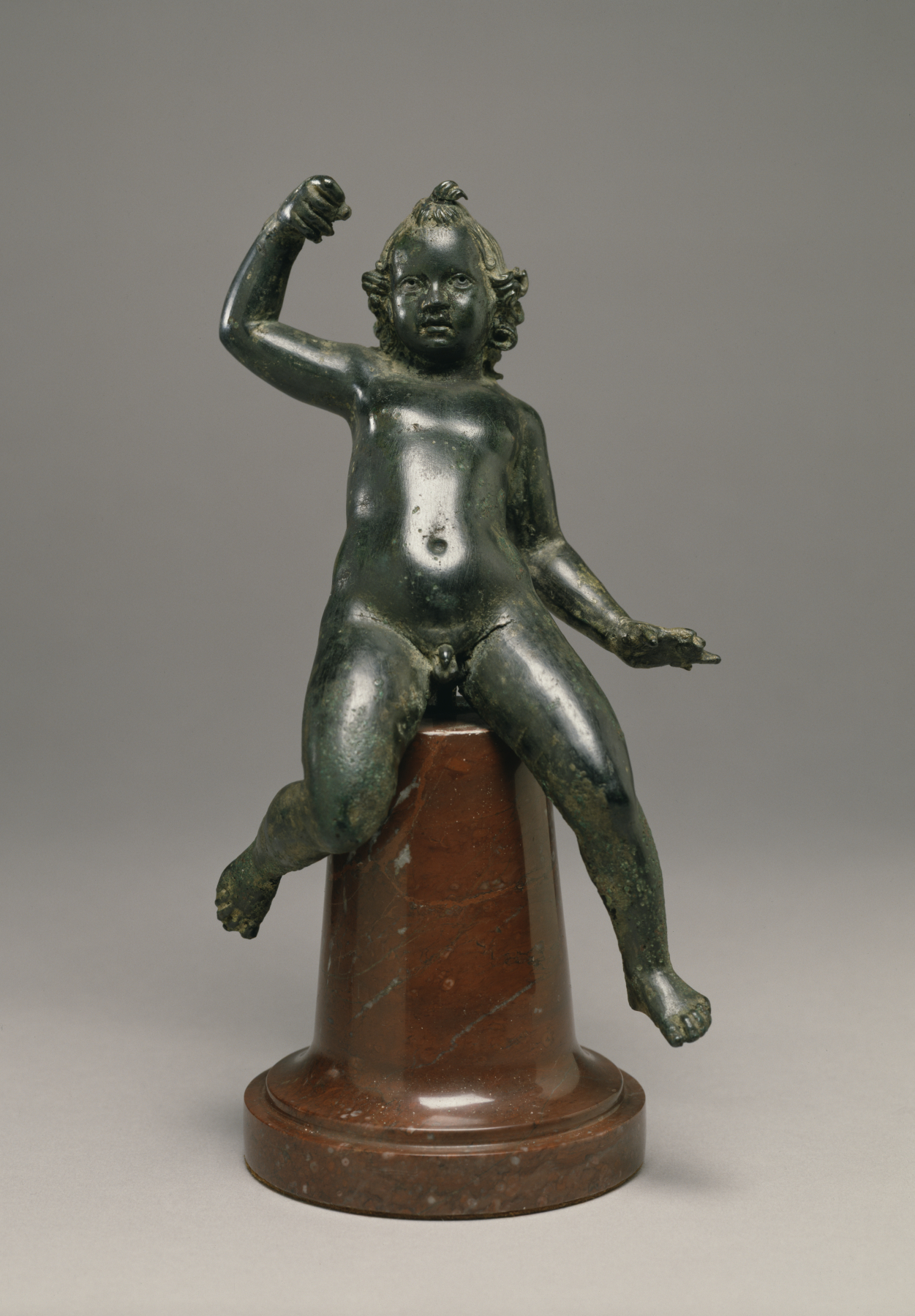
Figure of wingless Eros; 20–60 AD; cast bronze and silver inlay; 17.2 × 9.5 × 6.8 cm; Walters Art Museum

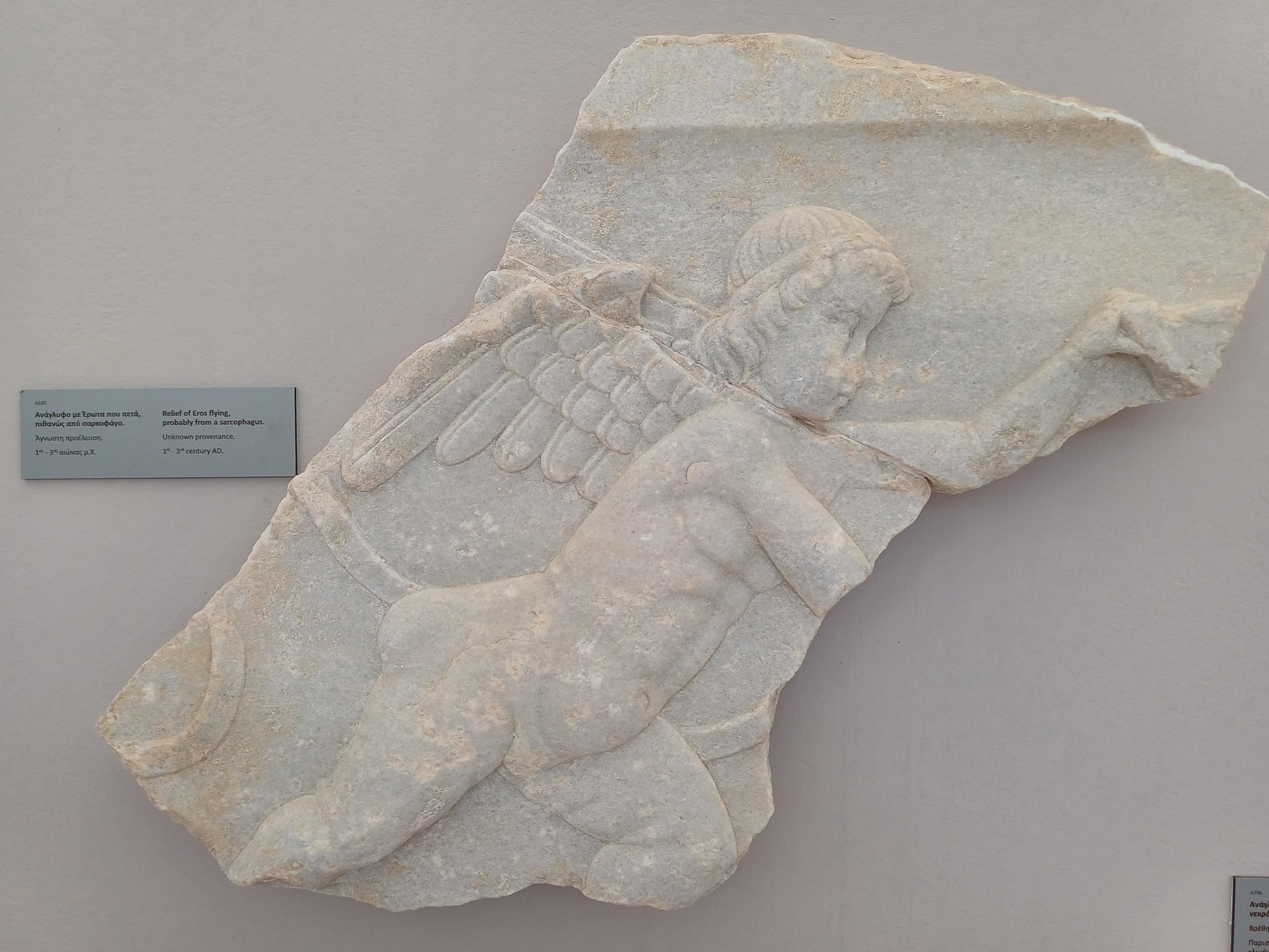
Relief of Eros flying; marble; possibly part of a sarcophagus; unknown provenance; 1st to 3rd century AD; Archaeological Museum of Paros

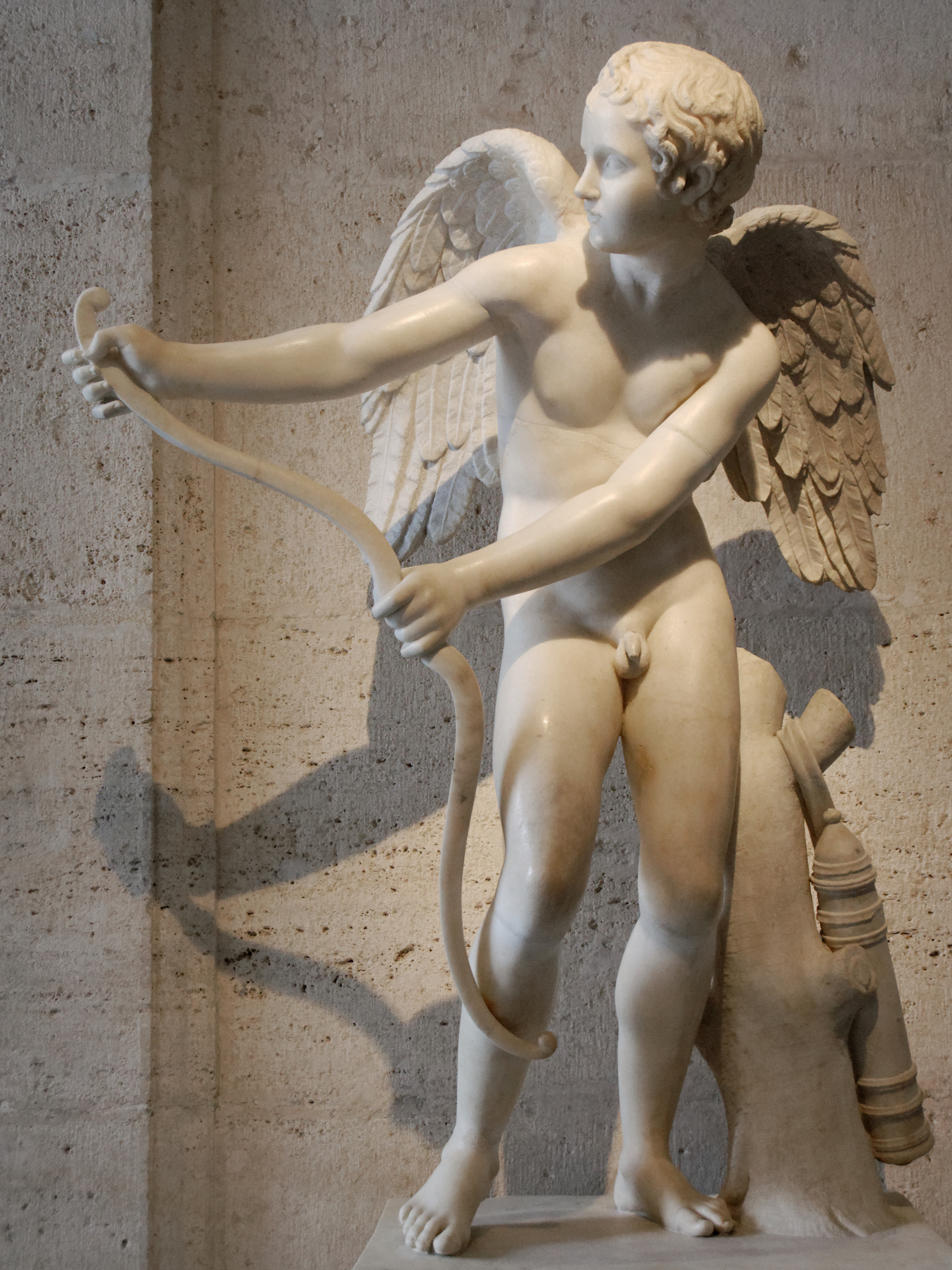
Eros Stringing his Bow, a Roman copy from the Capitoline Museum of a Greek original by Lysippos; 2nd century AD; marble; height: 123 cm; Capitoline Museum (Rome)

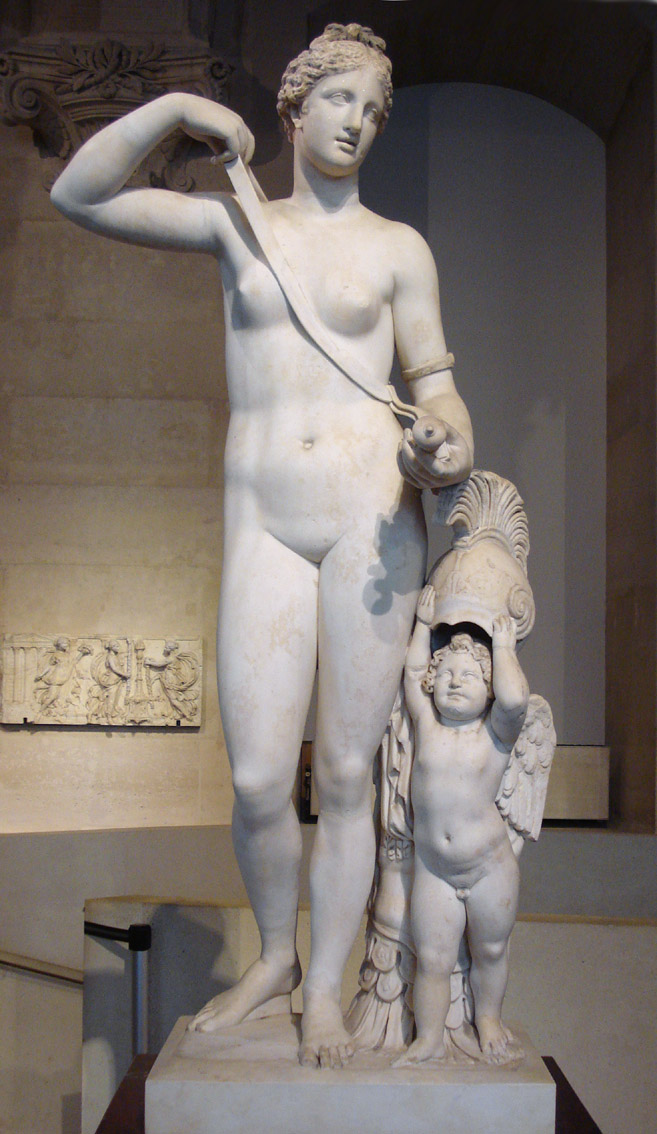
Armed Aphrodite with young Eros.

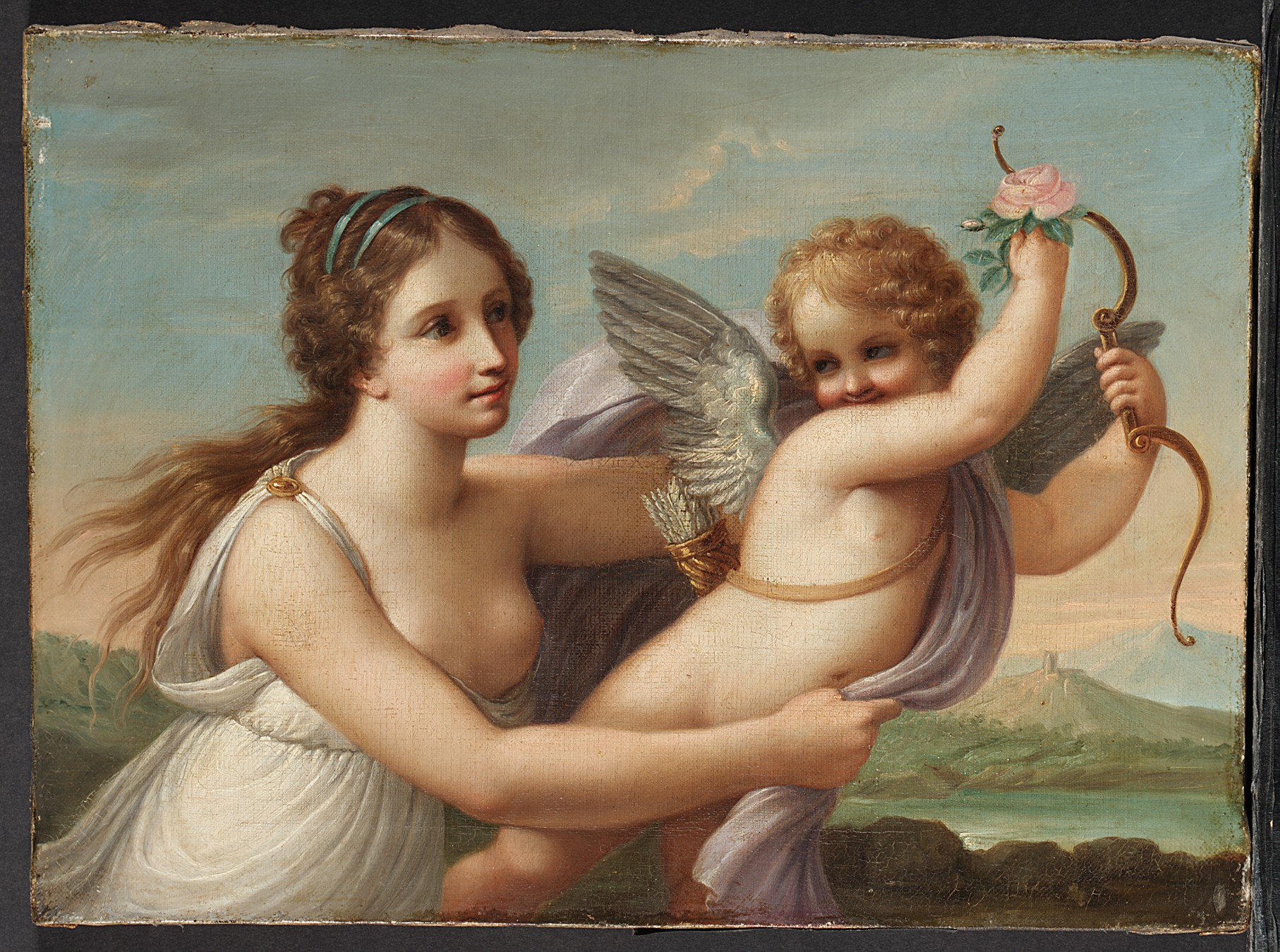
The Victory of Eros; by Angelica Kauffman; 1750–1775; oil on canvas; Metropolitan Museum of Art

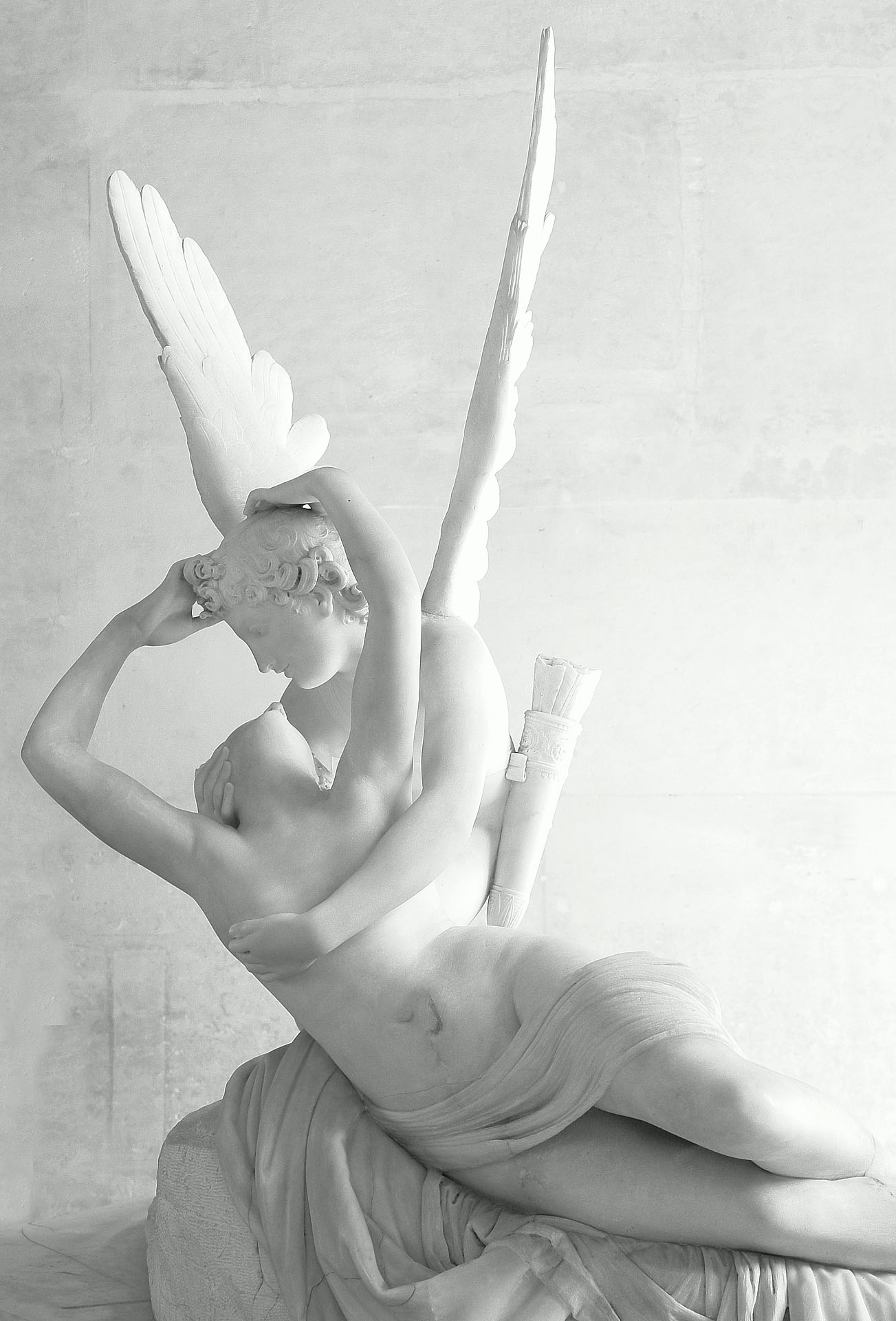
Psyche Revived by Cupid's Kiss; by Antonio Canova; c. 1787–1793; marble; height: 1.55 m, width: 1.69 m, depth: 1.01 m; Louvre

A Girl Defending Herself against Eros; by William-Adolphe Bouguereau; c. 1880; Getty Center (Los Angeles, US)

== See also ==
- Eros (concept)
- Greek words for love
- Kamadeva
- Family tree of the Greek gods
- Phanes (mythology)
