= Mithraism in comparison with other belief systems =

Similarities and differences of the Roman cult of Mithras and other religions

This is an article on Mithraism in comparative mythology and comparative theology. See Mithraic mysteries for the main article.

The Roman cult of Mithras had connections with other pagan deities, syncretism being a prominent feature of Roman paganism. Almost all Mithraea contain statues dedicated to gods of other cults, and it is common to find inscriptions dedicated to Mithras in other sanctuaries, especially those of Jupiter Dolichenus. Mithraism was not an alternative to other pagan religions, but rather a particular way of practising pagan worship; and many Mithraic initiates can also be found worshipping in the civic religion, and as initiates of other mystery cults.

== Comparisons with contemporary Roman gods ==
=== Phanes ===
Orphic speculation influenced the cult of Mithras at times. In Orphic cosmogony, Phanes emerges from the world egg at the beginning of time, bringing the universe into existence.

There is some literary evidence of the syncretism of Mithras and Phanes. A list of the eight elements of creation appears in Zenobius and Theon of Smyrna; most of the elements are the same, but in Zenobius, the seventh element is "Mithras", in Theon it is "Phanes". Theon gives the same list but substitutes Phanes.

A Greek inscription on a statue base from a mithraeum in Rome reads "to Deus Sol Mithras Phanes". A relief from Vercovicium on Hadrian's Wall shows Mithras emerging from the cosmic egg, which is represented both as such and by the shape of the zodiacal ring. Ulansey adds, "The identification between Mithras and Phanes indicated by CIMRM 860 is also explicitly attested by an inscription found in Rome dedicated to 'Zeus-Helios-Mithras-Phanes' and another inscription dedicated to 'Helios-Mithras-Phanes'."

Another syncretistic relief is in Modena. This shows Phanes coming from an egg with flames shooting out around him, surrounded by the twelve signs of the zodiac, in an image very similar to that at Newcastle. Further references also exist.

=== Helios/Sol/Sol invictus ===
Mithras's stock epithet is Sol Invictus, "invincible sun". However, Mithras is distinct from both deities known as Sol Invictus, and they are separate entities on Mithraic statuary and artwork such as the tauroctony, hunting scenes, and banquet scenes, in which Mithras dines with Sol. Other scenes feature Mithras ascending behind Sol in the latter's chariot, the deities shaking hands and the two gods at an altar with pieces of meat on a spit or spits. One peculiar scene shows Sol kneeling before Mithras, who holds an object in his hand, interpreted as either a Phrygian cap or the haunch of the bull.

Unlike Helios or Sol, who was part of the traditional state-sponsored Roman religious system, and also unlike the Sol Invictus cult, which became an official state-sponsored cult under Aurelian in 274, the Mithraism (as with all other Greco-Roman mysteries) did not receive state sanction. Under Commodus's rule (r. 180–192 CE), the title invictus became a standard part of divine and imperial epithets, but this adapted from Hercules Invictus, not from either Sol or Mithras.

=== Jupiter Dolichenus ===
The Mithraea at Carnuntum appear to have been constructed in close association with contemporary temples of Jupiter Dolichenus, and there seem to have been considerable similarities between the two cults; both being mystery cults with secret liturgies, both being popular in the military, and having similar names for their officials and initiates. Two large Mithrea have been discovered in Doliche itself (modern Gaziantep in Turkey), which have been proposed as being unusually early.

== Mithraism and Christianity ==
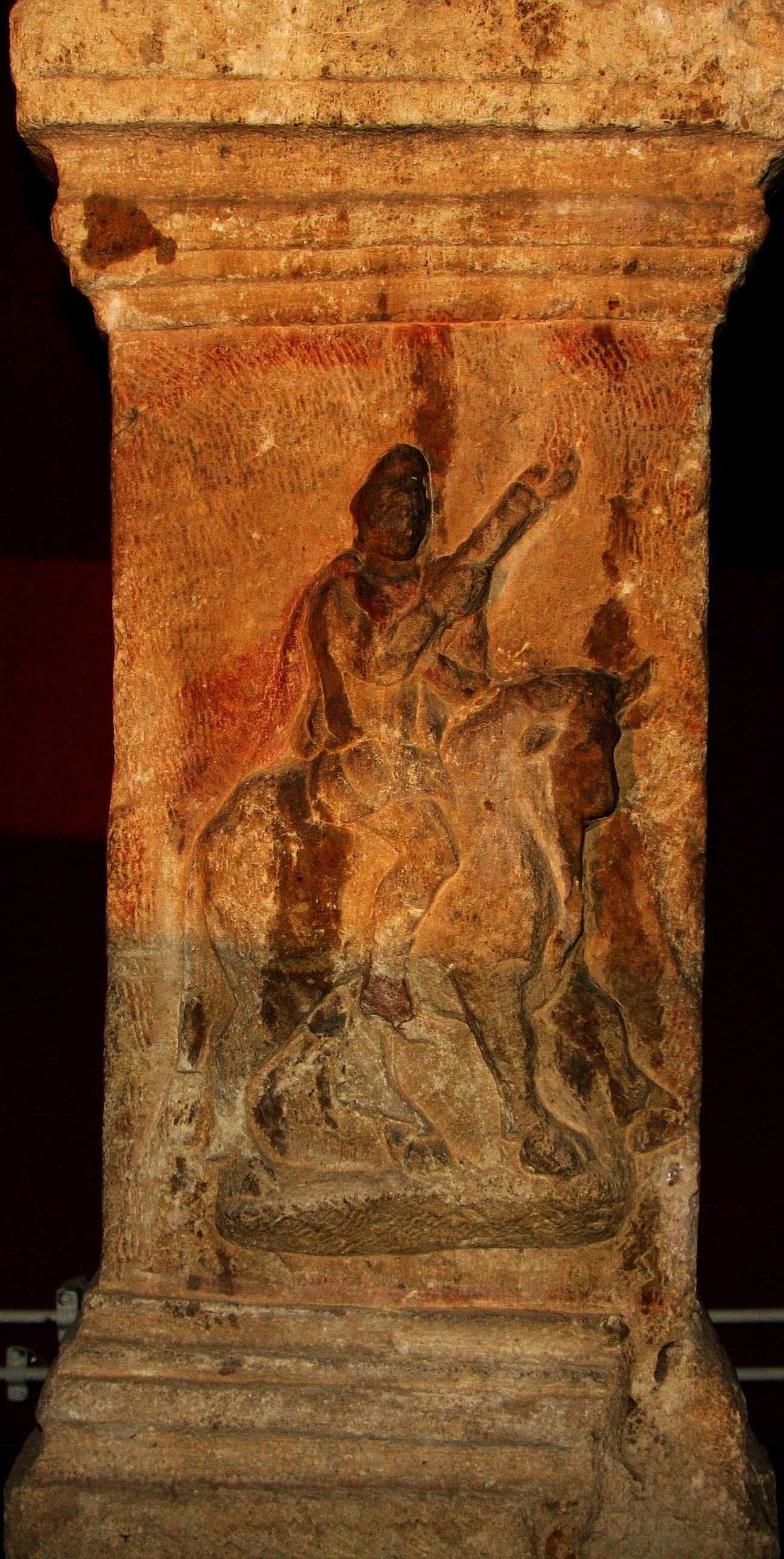
Mithraic altar depicting Cautes riding a bull (Sibiu/Hermannstadt, Romania).

Most scholars date Mithraism as existing prior to Christianity. Persian scholar and art historian, Abolala Soudavar, cites notable Greek thinker, Plutarch, whose writing represents the earliest account on this issue. In the year 67 BCE, pirates who had more than a thousand sails and had captured more than four hundred cities

"offered strange rites of their own at Mount Olympus, and celebrated there, certain secret rites, among which those of Mithras continue to the present time, having been first instituted by them ..." — Plutarch

Soudavar submits that Plutarch pins Mithraic worship in Rome long before the birth of Christ, and it is therefore improbable that Christian traditions informed Mithraic, but rather the opposite.

Despite Plutarch's original chronological documentation of Mithraism predating early Christianity, a remark in the 2nd century by the first Christian apologist Justin Martyr accused the Mithraists of diabolically imitating the Christian communion rite, which indicates one instance of the evolution of Mithraism many years after its first known appearance. (Note: For the apostles, in the memoirs composed by them, which are called Gospels, have thus delivered unto us what was enjoined upon them; that Jesus took bread, and when He had given thanks, said, "This do ye in remembrance of Me, this is My body; "and that, after the same manner, having taken the cup and given thanks, He said, "This is My blood; "and gave it to them alone. Which the wicked devils have imitated in the mysteries of Mithras, commanding the same thing to be done. For, that bread and a cup of water are placed with certain incantations in the mystic rites of one who is being initiated, you either know or can learn. — Justin Martyr) Justin Martyr was born roughly 50 years after Plutarch. A late-2nd-century Greek scholar and philosopher, Celsus, references how later Ophite gnostic ideas overlapped with the early mysteries of Mithras; however, the writing of Celsus was systematically suppressed by a growing Christian community shortly thereafter. (Note: Clauss, M. The Roman Cult of Mithras. p. 17, cites Origen. Contra Celsum. book 6, cc. 22-24.: "There, a ladder of seven steps is described, similar to one used by the Ophites." Clauss states that the borrowing was by the Mithraists, but nothing in Contra Celsum seems to say so.)

Originator of the Christ myth theory, Charles-François Dupuis, set out to prove the Mithraic origins of Christianity. Dupuis points out the absence of non-Christian historical records pertaining to Jesus, as well as the shared narrative structure possessed by the biblical account of Jesus and other notable myths. Dupuis claims this as evidence that suggests the New Testament's story of Jesus was likely a mythological construct created as a means to control religious practices.

In 1882, Ernest Renan posited a case of two rival religions. He writes, "If the growth of Christianity had been arrested by some mortal malady, the world would have been Mithraic."

Christian apologists, among them Ronald Nash and Edwin Yamauchi, have suggested a different interpretation of Mithraism's relationship to Christianity. Yamauchi, pointing out that some of the textual evidence for Mithraist doctrine was written after the New Testament was in circulation, makes a logical leap in considering that it is more likely that Mithraism borrowed from Christianity, rather than the other way around. Ultimately, Plutarch provides the earliest unbiased account of Mithraism's earlier existence, which continues to provoke scholarly response.

=== Miraculous birth ===
Mithras was born from a rock, not a virgin woman. David Ulansey speculates that this was a belief derived from the Perseus myths, which held he was born from a cavern.

=== 25 December ===
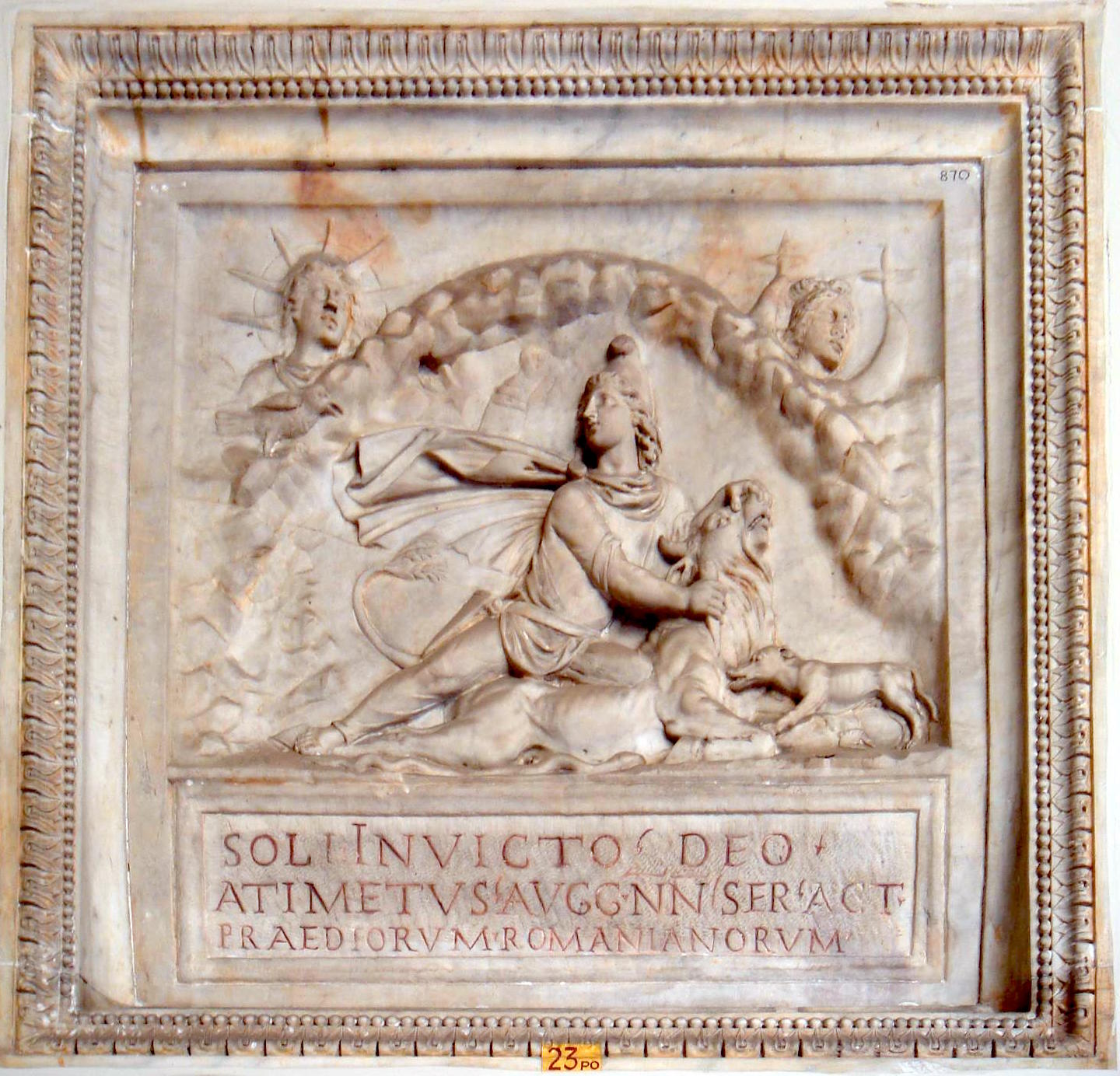
Bas-relief of Mithras looking to Sol Invictus as he slays the bull. Inscription top line: Soli Invicto Deo.

It is often stated (e.g. by Encyclopaedia Britannica, the Catholic Encyclopedia, (Note: Martindale (1908): The well-known solar feast ... of Natalis Invicti, celebrated on 25 December, has a strong claim on the responsibility for our December date. / ... [3rd century St.] Cyprian [of Carthage wrote] ... "O, how wonderfully acted Providence that on that day on which that Sun was born ... Christ should be born." / In the fourth century, Chrysostom ... writes ... "But Our Lord, too, is born in the month of December ... the eight before the calends of January [25 December] ..., But they call it the 'Birthday of the Unconquered'. Who indeed is so unconquered as Our Lord ...? Or, if they say that it is the birthday of the Sun, He is the Sun of Justice." / Already Tertullian... had to assert that Sol was not the Christians' God; Augustine ... denounces the heretical identification of Christ with Sol. / Pope Leo I ... bitterly reproves solar survivals – Christians, on the very doorstep of the Apostles' basilica, turn to adore the rising sun.) and others) that Mithras was born on December 25. Beck (1987) argues that this is unproven. He writes:

"The only evidence for it is the celebration of the birthday of Invictus on that date in Calendar of Philocalus. Invictus is of course Sol Invictus, Aurelian's sun god. It does not follow that a different, earlier, and unofficial sun god, Sol Invictus Mithras, was necessarily or even probably, born on that day too." (Note: Note that Helios / Sol played a prominent role in the Mithraic mysteries, both as an individual deity separate from Mithras and as a composite deity equated with Mithras as Sol Invictus Mithras.)

Unusually amongst Roman mystery cults, the mysteries of Mithras had no "public" face; worship of Mithras was confined to initiates, and they could only undertake such worship in the secrecy of the Mithraeum. Clauss (1990) states:

"the Mithraic Mysteries had no public ceremonies of its own. The festival of natalis Invicti [Birth of the Unconquerable (Sun)], held on 25 December, was a general festival of the Sun, and by no means specific to the Mysteries of Mithras.".

Steven Hijmans has discussed in detail whether the general natalis Invicti festival was related to Christmas but does not give Mithras as a possible source.

Meanwhile, in modern-day Iran, the original homeland of Mithra, its religious followers celebrate a traditional feast of his birth. The present-day Iran Chamber Society's Ramona Shashaani claims that Christians borrowed the 25 December date from this "Persian" (i.e. Parsee = Zoroastrian) tradition:

While Christians around the world are preparing to celebrate Christmas on Dec. 25th, the Persians are getting ready to tribute one of their most festive celebrations on Dec. 21st, the eve of winter solstice, the longest night and shortest day of the year. In Iran this night is called Shab-e Yaldaa, also known as Shab-e Chelleh, which refers to the birthday or rebirth of the sun.
... Yaldaa is chiefly related to Mehr Yazat; it is the night of the birth of the unconquerable sun, Mehr or Mithra, meaning love and sun, and has been celebrated by the followers of Mithraism as early as 5000 BC
... But in the [Roman-controlled areas] 4th century AD, because of some errors in counting the leap year, the birthday of Mithra shifted to 25 December and was established as such.

=== Salvation ===
A painted text on the wall of the St. Prisca Mithraeum (c. 200 CE) in Rome contains the words: et nos servasti (?) ... sanguine fuso (and you have saved us ... in the shed blood). The meaning of this text is unclear, although presumably it refers to the bull killed by Mithras, as no other source refers to a Mithraic salvation.

However, the servasti is only a conjecture. According to Robert Turcan, Mithraic salvation had little to do with the other-worldly destiny of individual souls, but was on the Zoroastrian pattern of man's participation in the cosmic struggle of the good creation against the forces of evil. Another difference is found with Mithras' slaying the bull is the sacrifice, while in Christianity the sacrifice was Christ himself.

Akhondi and Akbari also claim red was a color of prominence. The sacrifice of the bull's holy blood was a sign of fertility and life, much as in Christianity red wine can symbolize the sacrifice of Christ. In addition, white was an important color for the cult. The bull always remained white because it was a symbol of purity and holiness. Moon and stars painted in gold and white were also important symbols to the cult and later incorporated into Christian architecture and other decorations.

Mithraists believed that one day Mithra's works would be complete on earth and that he would return to heaven.

=== Symbolism of water ===
Monuments in the Danube area depict Mithras shooting a bow at a rock in the presence of the torch-bearers, apparently to encourage water to come forth. Clauss states that, after the ritual meal, this "water-miracle offers the clearest parallel with Christianity".

=== Sign of the cross ===
Tertullian states that followers of Mithras were marked on their forehead in an unspecified manner. There is no indication that this mark was made in the form of a cross, or a branding, or a tattoo, or a permanent mark of any kind. The symbol of a circle with a diagonal cross inscribed within it is commonly found in Mithraea, especially in association with the Leontocephaline figure.

=== Mithraic motifs and medieval Christian art ===
From the end of the 18th century some scholars have suggested that certain elements in medieval Christian art reflect images found in Mithraic reliefs. Franz Cumont was among these scholars. Cumont suggested that after the triumph of the Christian church over paganism, artists continued to make use of stock images originally devised for Mithras in order to depict the new and unfamiliar stories of the bible. The "stranglehold of the workshop" meant that the first Christian artworks were heavily based on pagan art, and "a few alterations in costume and attitude transformed a pagan scene into a Christian picture".

A series of scholars have since discussed possible similarities with Mithraic reliefs in medieval Romanesque art. Vermaseren (1963) stated that the only certain example of such influence was an image of Elijah drawn up to heaven in a chariot drawn by fiery horses. Deman (1971) claimed that a similarity of image does not tell us whether this implies an ideological influence, or merely a tradition of craftmanship. He then gave a list of medieval reliefs that parallel Mithraic images, but refused to draw conclusions from such parallels, despite volunteering this evidence.

=== Mithraea re-used in Christian worship ===
Several of the best preserved Mithraea, especially those in Rome such as at San Clemente and Santa Prisca, are now to be found underneath Christian churches. It has been suggested that these instances might indicate a tendency for Christians to adopt Mithraea for Christian worship, in a similar manner to the undoubted conversion into churches of temples and shrines of civic paganism, such as the Pantheon. However, in these Roman instances, the Mithraeum appears to have been filled with rubble prior to the erection of a church over the top; and hence they cannot be considered demonstrable examples of deliberate re-use. A study of early Christian churches in Britain concluded that, if anything, the evidence there suggested a tendency to avoid locating churches on the sites of former Mithraea.

On the other hand, there is at least one known example of a Mithraic carved relief being re-used on a Christian church, in the early 11th-century tower added to the church of St Peter at Gowts in Lincoln, England. A much-weathered Mithraic lion-headed figure carrying keys (presumably from a ruined Mithraeum in Roman Lincoln) was incorporated into the church tower, apparently in the mistaken belief that it was an ancient representation of the Apostle Peter. Elsewhere, as in one of the Mithraea in Doliche, there are instances where the tauroctony of a cave Mithraeum has been replaced by a cross, which suggests later use as a church; but again the date of re-use cannot be determined, and hence it is by no means certain how far the Christian occupiers were aware of their cave's Mithraic past.
