= Phanes =

Ancient Greek deity of procreation

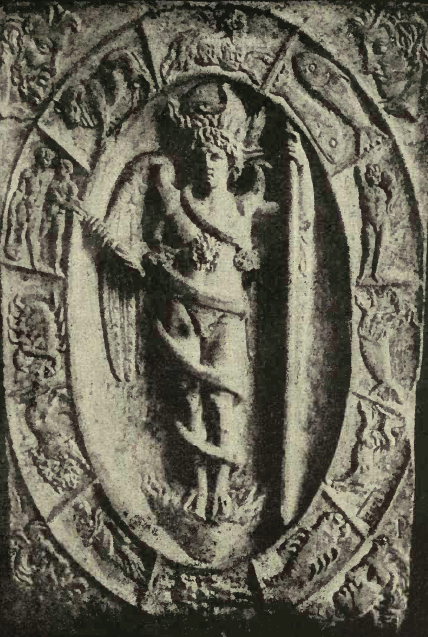
A figure who has been identified as Protogonos, on a relief from Modena, 2nd century AD

In Orphic cosmogony, Phanes /ˈfeɪˌniːz/ (Ancient Greek: Φάνης) or Protogonos /proʊˈtɒɡənəs/ (Πρωτογόνος 'Firstborn') is a primeval deity who was born from the cosmic egg at the beginning of creation. He is referred to by various names, including Erikepaios "Power" /ˌɛrɪkəˈpiːəs/ (Ancient Greek: Ἠρικαπαῖος/Ἠρικεπαῖος) and Metis "Thought".

== Mythology ==
In Orphic cosmogony, Phanes is often equated with Eros or Mithras and has been depicted as a deity emerging from a cosmic egg entwined with a serpent: the Orphic egg. He had a helmet and broad, golden wings. The Orphic cosmogony is quite unlike the creation sagas offered by Homer and Hesiod. Scholars have suggested that Orphism is "un-Greek", even "Asiatic", in conception because of its inherent dualism.

Chronos is said to have created the silver egg of the universe out of which burst the first-born deity Phanes, or Phanes-Dionysus. Phanes was an androgynous god, with both a penis and vagina.

Phanes was a deity of light and goodness, whose name meant "to bring light" or "to shine"; a first-born deity, he emerged from the abyss and gave birth to the universe. Nyx (Night) is variously said to be Phanes's daughter or older wife; she is the counterpart of Phanes and is considered by Aristophanes the first deity.

In Orphic literature, Phanes was believed to have been hatched from the world egg of Chronos and Ananke "Necessity, Fate" or Nyx in the form of a black bird and wind. His older wife Nyx called him Protogenos. As she created nighttime, Phanes created daytime and the method of creation by mingling. He was made the ruler of the deities. This new Orphic tradition states that Phanes passed the sceptre to Nyx; Nyx later gave the sceptre to her son Ouranos; Cronus seized the sceptre from his father Ouranos; and finally, the sceptre held by Cronus was seized by Zeus, who holds it at present. Some Orphic myths suggest that Zeus intends to pass the sceptre to Dionysus.

According to the Athenian scholiast Damascius, Phanes was the first god "expressible and acceptable to human ears" ("πρώτης ητόν τι ἐχούσης καὶ σύμμετρον πρὸς ἀνθρώπων ἀκοάς"). Another Orphic Hymn states:

You scattered the dark mist that lay before your eyes and, flapping your wings, you whirled about, and throughout this world you brought pure light. For this I call you Phanes, I call you Lord Priapos, I call you sparkling with bright eyes.

The Derveni papyrus refers to Phanes:

Of the First-born king, the reverend one; and upon him all the immortals grew, blessed gods and goddesses and rivers and lovely springs and everything else that had then been born; and he himself became the sole one.

In the Orphic Hymns, Phanes-Protogonus is identified with Dionysus, who is referred to under the names of Protogonus and Eubuleus several times in the collection.

== See also ==
- Cosmic Man
- Mithraism in comparison with Phanes
