= Erikepaios =

Title for the Orphic god Phanes

In Orphic literature, Erikepaios (Ancient Greek: Ἠρικεπαῖος, lit. 'power'), also spelled Ericepaeus, was a title for the god Phanes, mentioned in Orphic poetry and the associated Dionysian Mysteries. It is a non-Greek name for which no certain interpretation has been found.

== Discussion ==
Scholars have long been perplexed by the name Erikepaios, and naturally, most of them have attempted to derive it from Greek etymology, however this seems questionable linguistically. The name has also been thought to have Hebrew origins because of its resemblance to erekh appayim, "slow to anger." It has been argued, even in antiquity, that the name Erikepaios was an Oriental import. Thus, John Malalas, the 6th century CE Antiotian historian, derives the name from the language spoken in his region. The name is first mentioned with certainty in the Gurôb papyrus, a Dionysian Mysteries text of the late 3rd century BCE.

The mythographer Otto Gruppe suggested the Phanes-myth appeared in its original form in Babylonia. Thence it spread over the Near East, and took root particularly in Syria and Asia Minor. The gods of Babylon themselves were not imported, but the myth was attached to the local deities of the districts to which it spread.

Erikepaios became important in a now-lost Orphic theogony referred to by modern scholars as the "Rhapsodic Theogony", which was likely composed in the 1st century BC or AD. It is known through summaries in later neo-Platonist authors.
